

134001–134100 

|-bgcolor=#d6d6d6
| 134001 ||  || — || November 3, 2004 || Anderson Mesa || LONEOS || — || align=right | 3.7 km || 
|-id=002 bgcolor=#E9E9E9
| 134002 ||  || — || November 3, 2004 || Anderson Mesa || LONEOS || — || align=right | 4.8 km || 
|-id=003 bgcolor=#d6d6d6
| 134003 Ingridgalinsky ||  ||  || November 3, 2004 || Catalina || CSS || — || align=right | 5.2 km || 
|-id=004 bgcolor=#fefefe
| 134004 ||  || — || November 2, 2004 || Anderson Mesa || LONEOS || — || align=right | 1.4 km || 
|-id=005 bgcolor=#fefefe
| 134005 ||  || — || November 4, 2004 || Kitt Peak || Spacewatch || — || align=right | 1.2 km || 
|-id=006 bgcolor=#E9E9E9
| 134006 ||  || — || November 3, 2004 || Kitt Peak || Spacewatch || — || align=right | 1.8 km || 
|-id=007 bgcolor=#E9E9E9
| 134007 ||  || — || November 4, 2004 || Kitt Peak || Spacewatch || — || align=right | 3.8 km || 
|-id=008 bgcolor=#E9E9E9
| 134008 Davidhammond ||  ||  || November 4, 2004 || Catalina || CSS || WAT || align=right | 2.5 km || 
|-id=009 bgcolor=#d6d6d6
| 134009 ||  || — || November 5, 2004 || Palomar || NEAT || — || align=right | 2.4 km || 
|-id=010 bgcolor=#fefefe
| 134010 ||  || — || November 7, 2004 || Wrightwood || J. W. Young || MAS || align=right | 1.1 km || 
|-id=011 bgcolor=#fefefe
| 134011 ||  || — || November 4, 2004 || Kitt Peak || Spacewatch || — || align=right | 1.8 km || 
|-id=012 bgcolor=#fefefe
| 134012 ||  || — || November 4, 2004 || Kitt Peak || Spacewatch || NYS || align=right data-sort-value="0.86" | 860 m || 
|-id=013 bgcolor=#fefefe
| 134013 ||  || — || November 4, 2004 || Kitt Peak || Spacewatch || — || align=right | 1.5 km || 
|-id=014 bgcolor=#fefefe
| 134014 ||  || — || November 4, 2004 || Kitt Peak || Spacewatch || V || align=right | 1.1 km || 
|-id=015 bgcolor=#fefefe
| 134015 ||  || — || November 4, 2004 || Kitt Peak || Spacewatch || — || align=right | 1.3 km || 
|-id=016 bgcolor=#d6d6d6
| 134016 ||  || — || November 7, 2004 || Socorro || LINEAR || 3:2 || align=right | 5.4 km || 
|-id=017 bgcolor=#E9E9E9
| 134017 ||  || — || November 7, 2004 || Socorro || LINEAR || — || align=right | 2.1 km || 
|-id=018 bgcolor=#E9E9E9
| 134018 ||  || — || November 5, 2004 || Palomar || NEAT || — || align=right | 3.2 km || 
|-id=019 bgcolor=#fefefe
| 134019 Nathanmogk ||  ||  || November 9, 2004 || Catalina || CSS || — || align=right | 3.3 km || 
|-id=020 bgcolor=#E9E9E9
| 134020 ||  || — || November 6, 2004 || Socorro || LINEAR || — || align=right | 2.5 km || 
|-id=021 bgcolor=#E9E9E9
| 134021 ||  || — || November 7, 2004 || Socorro || LINEAR || — || align=right | 2.9 km || 
|-id=022 bgcolor=#d6d6d6
| 134022 ||  || — || November 10, 2004 || Kitt Peak || Spacewatch || HYG || align=right | 5.6 km || 
|-id=023 bgcolor=#fefefe
| 134023 ||  || — || November 7, 2004 || Socorro || LINEAR || — || align=right | 1.6 km || 
|-id=024 bgcolor=#E9E9E9
| 134024 ||  || — || November 9, 2004 || Haleakala || NEAT || MIS || align=right | 4.7 km || 
|-id=025 bgcolor=#E9E9E9
| 134025 ||  || — || November 3, 2004 || Kitt Peak || Spacewatch || — || align=right | 1.8 km || 
|-id=026 bgcolor=#E9E9E9
| 134026 ||  || — || November 7, 2004 || Socorro || LINEAR || HEN || align=right | 1.9 km || 
|-id=027 bgcolor=#fefefe
| 134027 Deanbooher ||  ||  || November 12, 2004 || Catalina || CSS || FLO || align=right | 1.2 km || 
|-id=028 bgcolor=#fefefe
| 134028 Mikefitzgibbon ||  ||  || November 12, 2004 || Catalina || CSS || — || align=right | 1.4 km || 
|-id=029 bgcolor=#fefefe
| 134029 ||  || — || November 10, 2004 || Kitt Peak || Spacewatch || — || align=right | 2.7 km || 
|-id=030 bgcolor=#d6d6d6
| 134030 ||  || — || November 2, 2004 || Palomar || NEAT || BRA || align=right | 2.9 km || 
|-id=031 bgcolor=#fefefe
| 134031 || 2004 WY || — || November 17, 2004 || Siding Spring || SSS || NYS || align=right | 2.7 km || 
|-id=032 bgcolor=#fefefe
| 134032 ||  || — || November 18, 2004 || Socorro || LINEAR || — || align=right | 2.8 km || 
|-id=033 bgcolor=#fefefe
| 134033 ||  || — || November 19, 2004 || Socorro || LINEAR || — || align=right | 2.8 km || 
|-id=034 bgcolor=#fefefe
| 134034 Bloomenthal ||  ||  || November 19, 2004 || Catalina || CSS || — || align=right | 1.1 km || 
|-id=035 bgcolor=#E9E9E9
| 134035 ||  || — || November 18, 2004 || Socorro || LINEAR || — || align=right | 2.1 km || 
|-id=036 bgcolor=#d6d6d6
| 134036 Austincummings ||  ||  || December 1, 2004 || Catalina || CSS || — || align=right | 5.9 km || 
|-id=037 bgcolor=#E9E9E9
| 134037 ||  || — || December 2, 2004 || Socorro || LINEAR || — || align=right | 3.0 km || 
|-id=038 bgcolor=#fefefe
| 134038 ||  || — || December 2, 2004 || Palomar || NEAT || H || align=right | 1.4 km || 
|-id=039 bgcolor=#d6d6d6
| 134039 Stephaniebarnes ||  ||  || December 2, 2004 || Catalina || CSS || 3:2 || align=right | 11 km || 
|-id=040 bgcolor=#E9E9E9
| 134040 Beaubierhaus ||  ||  || December 2, 2004 || Catalina || CSS || ADE || align=right | 3.6 km || 
|-id=041 bgcolor=#d6d6d6
| 134041 ||  || — || December 8, 2004 || Socorro || LINEAR || — || align=right | 6.5 km || 
|-id=042 bgcolor=#E9E9E9
| 134042 ||  || — || December 8, 2004 || Socorro || LINEAR || GAL || align=right | 3.4 km || 
|-id=043 bgcolor=#d6d6d6
| 134043 ||  || — || December 8, 2004 || Socorro || LINEAR || — || align=right | 4.1 km || 
|-id=044 bgcolor=#fefefe
| 134044 Chrisshinohara ||  ||  || December 9, 2004 || Catalina || CSS || PHO || align=right | 2.9 km || 
|-id=045 bgcolor=#d6d6d6
| 134045 ||  || — || December 8, 2004 || Socorro || LINEAR || — || align=right | 4.6 km || 
|-id=046 bgcolor=#fefefe
| 134046 ||  || — || December 8, 2004 || Socorro || LINEAR || NYS || align=right data-sort-value="0.88" | 880 m || 
|-id=047 bgcolor=#fefefe
| 134047 ||  || — || December 8, 2004 || Socorro || LINEAR || — || align=right | 1.8 km || 
|-id=048 bgcolor=#d6d6d6
| 134048 ||  || — || December 8, 2004 || Socorro || LINEAR || — || align=right | 7.9 km || 
|-id=049 bgcolor=#d6d6d6
| 134049 ||  || — || December 9, 2004 || Socorro || LINEAR || — || align=right | 4.1 km || 
|-id=050 bgcolor=#d6d6d6
| 134050 Rebeccaghent ||  ||  || December 9, 2004 || Catalina || CSS || — || align=right | 5.7 km || 
|-id=051 bgcolor=#E9E9E9
| 134051 ||  || — || December 10, 2004 || Socorro || LINEAR || XIZ || align=right | 2.3 km || 
|-id=052 bgcolor=#d6d6d6
| 134052 ||  || — || December 10, 2004 || Socorro || LINEAR || — || align=right | 4.3 km || 
|-id=053 bgcolor=#fefefe
| 134053 ||  || — || December 10, 2004 || Socorro || LINEAR || — || align=right | 1.4 km || 
|-id=054 bgcolor=#d6d6d6
| 134054 ||  || — || December 10, 2004 || Socorro || LINEAR || — || align=right | 5.6 km || 
|-id=055 bgcolor=#fefefe
| 134055 ||  || — || December 10, 2004 || Kitt Peak || Spacewatch || — || align=right | 1.3 km || 
|-id=056 bgcolor=#fefefe
| 134056 ||  || — || December 11, 2004 || Campo Imperatore || CINEOS || — || align=right | 1.2 km || 
|-id=057 bgcolor=#fefefe
| 134057 ||  || — || December 7, 2004 || Socorro || LINEAR || — || align=right | 3.0 km || 
|-id=058 bgcolor=#E9E9E9
| 134058 ||  || — || December 7, 2004 || Socorro || LINEAR || EUN || align=right | 2.3 km || 
|-id=059 bgcolor=#d6d6d6
| 134059 ||  || — || December 10, 2004 || Socorro || LINEAR || — || align=right | 4.2 km || 
|-id=060 bgcolor=#d6d6d6
| 134060 ||  || — || December 11, 2004 || Campo Imperatore || CINEOS || — || align=right | 5.9 km || 
|-id=061 bgcolor=#E9E9E9
| 134061 ||  || — || December 8, 2004 || Socorro || LINEAR || — || align=right | 2.6 km || 
|-id=062 bgcolor=#E9E9E9
| 134062 ||  || — || December 10, 2004 || Socorro || LINEAR || — || align=right | 4.0 km || 
|-id=063 bgcolor=#fefefe
| 134063 Damianhammond ||  ||  || December 9, 2004 || Catalina || CSS || SUL || align=right | 3.6 km || 
|-id=064 bgcolor=#fefefe
| 134064 ||  || — || December 8, 2004 || Socorro || LINEAR || — || align=right | 2.1 km || 
|-id=065 bgcolor=#E9E9E9
| 134065 ||  || — || December 10, 2004 || Kitt Peak || Spacewatch || PAD || align=right | 3.1 km || 
|-id=066 bgcolor=#d6d6d6
| 134066 ||  || — || December 12, 2004 || Kitt Peak || Spacewatch || — || align=right | 3.5 km || 
|-id=067 bgcolor=#fefefe
| 134067 ||  || — || December 12, 2004 || Kitt Peak || Spacewatch || NYS || align=right | 1.5 km || 
|-id=068 bgcolor=#fefefe
| 134068 ||  || — || December 8, 2004 || Socorro || LINEAR || — || align=right | 1.6 km || 
|-id=069 bgcolor=#d6d6d6
| 134069 Miyo ||  ||  || December 13, 2004 || Yamagata || K. Itagaki || — || align=right | 5.0 km || 
|-id=070 bgcolor=#d6d6d6
| 134070 ||  || — || December 2, 2004 || Kitt Peak || Spacewatch || EOS || align=right | 3.3 km || 
|-id=071 bgcolor=#d6d6d6
| 134071 ||  || — || December 2, 2004 || Palomar || NEAT || — || align=right | 5.2 km || 
|-id=072 bgcolor=#d6d6d6
| 134072 Sharonhooven ||  ||  || December 2, 2004 || Catalina || CSS || — || align=right | 4.7 km || 
|-id=073 bgcolor=#d6d6d6
| 134073 ||  || — || December 3, 2004 || Kitt Peak || Spacewatch || — || align=right | 4.5 km || 
|-id=074 bgcolor=#d6d6d6
| 134074 ||  || — || December 3, 2004 || Kitt Peak || Spacewatch || — || align=right | 5.0 km || 
|-id=075 bgcolor=#d6d6d6
| 134075 ||  || — || December 3, 2004 || Kitt Peak || Spacewatch || HYG || align=right | 5.3 km || 
|-id=076 bgcolor=#E9E9E9
| 134076 ||  || — || December 10, 2004 || Kitt Peak || Spacewatch || KON || align=right | 5.3 km || 
|-id=077 bgcolor=#C2FFFF
| 134077 ||  || — || December 12, 2004 || Kitt Peak || Spacewatch || L5 || align=right | 14 km || 
|-id=078 bgcolor=#fefefe
| 134078 ||  || — || December 10, 2004 || Socorro || LINEAR || MAS || align=right | 1.0 km || 
|-id=079 bgcolor=#d6d6d6
| 134079 ||  || — || December 10, 2004 || Socorro || LINEAR || THM || align=right | 4.0 km || 
|-id=080 bgcolor=#fefefe
| 134080 ||  || — || December 11, 2004 || Kitt Peak || Spacewatch || MAS || align=right | 1.2 km || 
|-id=081 bgcolor=#d6d6d6
| 134081 Johnmarshall ||  ||  || December 9, 2004 || Catalina || CSS || — || align=right | 5.8 km || 
|-id=082 bgcolor=#fefefe
| 134082 ||  || — || December 11, 2004 || Socorro || LINEAR || — || align=right | 1.6 km || 
|-id=083 bgcolor=#E9E9E9
| 134083 ||  || — || December 11, 2004 || Kitt Peak || Spacewatch || — || align=right | 2.6 km || 
|-id=084 bgcolor=#E9E9E9
| 134084 ||  || — || December 13, 2004 || Kitt Peak || Spacewatch || — || align=right | 2.7 km || 
|-id=085 bgcolor=#d6d6d6
| 134085 ||  || — || December 10, 2004 || Kitt Peak || Spacewatch || — || align=right | 2.7 km || 
|-id=086 bgcolor=#d6d6d6
| 134086 ||  || — || December 9, 2004 || Socorro || LINEAR || SYL7:4 || align=right | 7.1 km || 
|-id=087 bgcolor=#E9E9E9
| 134087 Symeonplatts ||  ||  || December 9, 2004 || Catalina || CSS || — || align=right | 2.5 km || 
|-id=088 bgcolor=#d6d6d6
| 134088 Brettperkins ||  ||  || December 9, 2004 || Catalina || CSS || — || align=right | 5.2 km || 
|-id=089 bgcolor=#E9E9E9
| 134089 ||  || — || December 10, 2004 || Kitt Peak || Spacewatch || — || align=right | 2.6 km || 
|-id=090 bgcolor=#fefefe
| 134090 ||  || — || December 11, 2004 || Socorro || LINEAR || V || align=right | 1.3 km || 
|-id=091 bgcolor=#d6d6d6
| 134091 Jaysoncowley ||  ||  || December 14, 2004 || Catalina || CSS || HYG || align=right | 4.4 km || 
|-id=092 bgcolor=#d6d6d6
| 134092 Lindaleematthias ||  ||  || December 14, 2004 || Catalina || CSS || EUP || align=right | 5.3 km || 
|-id=093 bgcolor=#E9E9E9
| 134093 ||  || — || December 14, 2004 || Kitt Peak || Spacewatch || — || align=right | 3.7 km || 
|-id=094 bgcolor=#d6d6d6
| 134094 ||  || — || December 12, 2004 || Kitt Peak || Spacewatch || KOR || align=right | 2.2 km || 
|-id=095 bgcolor=#E9E9E9
| 134095 ||  || — || December 12, 2004 || Kitt Peak || Spacewatch || AGN || align=right | 2.3 km || 
|-id=096 bgcolor=#E9E9E9
| 134096 ||  || — || December 15, 2004 || Socorro || LINEAR || — || align=right | 2.6 km || 
|-id=097 bgcolor=#E9E9E9
| 134097 ||  || — || December 10, 2004 || Socorro || LINEAR || — || align=right | 2.3 km || 
|-id=098 bgcolor=#E9E9E9
| 134098 ||  || — || December 10, 2004 || Socorro || LINEAR || — || align=right | 3.0 km || 
|-id=099 bgcolor=#d6d6d6
| 134099 Rexengelhardt ||  ||  || December 11, 2004 || Catalina || CSS || URS || align=right | 5.3 km || 
|-id=100 bgcolor=#d6d6d6
| 134100 ||  || — || December 10, 2004 || Socorro || LINEAR || — || align=right | 4.5 km || 
|}

134101–134200 

|-bgcolor=#d6d6d6
| 134101 ||  || — || December 15, 2004 || Socorro || LINEAR || — || align=right | 4.6 km || 
|-id=102 bgcolor=#E9E9E9
| 134102 ||  || — || December 15, 2004 || Socorro || LINEAR || — || align=right | 2.3 km || 
|-id=103 bgcolor=#d6d6d6
| 134103 ||  || — || December 15, 2004 || Socorro || LINEAR || — || align=right | 5.6 km || 
|-id=104 bgcolor=#E9E9E9
| 134104 ||  || — || December 13, 2004 || Kitt Peak || Spacewatch || AGN || align=right | 2.5 km || 
|-id=105 bgcolor=#d6d6d6
| 134105 Josephfust ||  ||  || December 14, 2004 || Catalina || CSS || THM || align=right | 3.8 km || 
|-id=106 bgcolor=#fefefe
| 134106 ||  || — || December 13, 2004 || Campo Imperatore || CINEOS || — || align=right | 1.2 km || 
|-id=107 bgcolor=#d6d6d6
| 134107 ||  || — || December 14, 2004 || Socorro || LINEAR || — || align=right | 3.6 km || 
|-id=108 bgcolor=#d6d6d6
| 134108 ||  || — || December 14, 2004 || Kitt Peak || Spacewatch || THM || align=right | 5.1 km || 
|-id=109 bgcolor=#d6d6d6
| 134109 Britneyburch ||  ||  || December 14, 2004 || Catalina || CSS || — || align=right | 6.5 km || 
|-id=110 bgcolor=#E9E9E9
| 134110 ||  || — || December 15, 2004 || Socorro || LINEAR || — || align=right | 2.4 km || 
|-id=111 bgcolor=#d6d6d6
| 134111 ||  || — || December 15, 2004 || Socorro || LINEAR || EOS || align=right | 3.5 km || 
|-id=112 bgcolor=#d6d6d6
| 134112 Jeremyralph ||  ||  || December 9, 2004 || Catalina || CSS || — || align=right | 5.6 km || 
|-id=113 bgcolor=#E9E9E9
| 134113 ||  || — || December 12, 2004 || Kitt Peak || Spacewatch || — || align=right | 2.4 km || 
|-id=114 bgcolor=#E9E9E9
| 134114 ||  || — || December 15, 2004 || Socorro || LINEAR || — || align=right | 2.3 km || 
|-id=115 bgcolor=#d6d6d6
| 134115 ||  || — || December 15, 2004 || Kitt Peak || Spacewatch || — || align=right | 4.2 km || 
|-id=116 bgcolor=#d6d6d6
| 134116 ||  || — || December 16, 2004 || Kitt Peak || Spacewatch || — || align=right | 3.8 km || 
|-id=117 bgcolor=#d6d6d6
| 134117 ||  || — || December 19, 2004 || Socorro || LINEAR || — || align=right | 7.4 km || 
|-id=118 bgcolor=#d6d6d6
| 134118 ||  || — || December 18, 2004 || Mount Lemmon || Mount Lemmon Survey || EMA || align=right | 5.4 km || 
|-id=119 bgcolor=#d6d6d6
| 134119 ||  || — || December 18, 2004 || Mount Lemmon || Mount Lemmon Survey || — || align=right | 4.8 km || 
|-id=120 bgcolor=#E9E9E9
| 134120 ||  || — || December 18, 2004 || Mount Lemmon || Mount Lemmon Survey || — || align=right | 3.9 km || 
|-id=121 bgcolor=#E9E9E9
| 134121 ||  || — || December 16, 2004 || Kitt Peak || Spacewatch || — || align=right | 2.0 km || 
|-id=122 bgcolor=#d6d6d6
| 134122 ||  || — || December 20, 2004 || Mount Lemmon || Mount Lemmon Survey || THM || align=right | 3.7 km || 
|-id=123 bgcolor=#d6d6d6
| 134123 ||  || — || December 20, 2004 || Mount Lemmon || Mount Lemmon Survey || ALA || align=right | 7.4 km || 
|-id=124 bgcolor=#d6d6d6
| 134124 Subirachs || 2005 AM ||  || January 2, 2005 || Begues || J. Manteca || — || align=right | 3.9 km || 
|-id=125 bgcolor=#d6d6d6
| 134125 Shaundaly ||  ||  || January 6, 2005 || Catalina || CSS || — || align=right | 4.9 km || 
|-id=126 bgcolor=#E9E9E9
| 134126 ||  || — || January 6, 2005 || Socorro || LINEAR || — || align=right | 2.6 km || 
|-id=127 bgcolor=#d6d6d6
| 134127 Basher ||  ||  || January 6, 2005 || Catalina || CSS || — || align=right | 5.2 km || 
|-id=128 bgcolor=#d6d6d6
| 134128 ||  || — || January 6, 2005 || Socorro || LINEAR || — || align=right | 6.8 km || 
|-id=129 bgcolor=#E9E9E9
| 134129 ||  || — || January 7, 2005 || Socorro || LINEAR || — || align=right | 3.4 km || 
|-id=130 bgcolor=#d6d6d6
| 134130 Apáczai ||  ||  || January 3, 2005 || Piszkéstető || K. Sárneczky || — || align=right | 5.4 km || 
|-id=131 bgcolor=#d6d6d6
| 134131 Skipowens ||  ||  || January 6, 2005 || Catalina || CSS || — || align=right | 3.9 km || 
|-id=132 bgcolor=#fefefe
| 134132 ||  || — || January 6, 2005 || Socorro || LINEAR || — || align=right | 1.2 km || 
|-id=133 bgcolor=#d6d6d6
| 134133 ||  || — || January 7, 2005 || Socorro || LINEAR || HYG || align=right | 4.5 km || 
|-id=134 bgcolor=#d6d6d6
| 134134 Kristoferdrozd ||  ||  || January 6, 2005 || Catalina || CSS || — || align=right | 5.2 km || 
|-id=135 bgcolor=#E9E9E9
| 134135 Steigerwald ||  ||  || January 7, 2005 || Catalina || CSS || HEN || align=right | 1.9 km || 
|-id=136 bgcolor=#d6d6d6
| 134136 ||  || — || January 8, 2005 || Campo Imperatore || CINEOS || — || align=right | 4.8 km || 
|-id=137 bgcolor=#E9E9E9
| 134137 ||  || — || January 8, 2005 || Campo Imperatore || CINEOS || — || align=right | 2.6 km || 
|-id=138 bgcolor=#E9E9E9
| 134138 Laurabayley ||  ||  || January 9, 2005 || Catalina || CSS || — || align=right | 5.2 km || 
|-id=139 bgcolor=#E9E9E9
| 134139 ||  || — || January 11, 2005 || Socorro || LINEAR || MAR || align=right | 1.7 km || 
|-id=140 bgcolor=#d6d6d6
| 134140 ||  || — || January 11, 2005 || Socorro || LINEAR || — || align=right | 7.4 km || 
|-id=141 bgcolor=#E9E9E9
| 134141 ||  || — || January 13, 2005 || Socorro || LINEAR || MAR || align=right | 2.4 km || 
|-id=142 bgcolor=#E9E9E9
| 134142 ||  || — || January 13, 2005 || Kitt Peak || Spacewatch || — || align=right | 3.5 km || 
|-id=143 bgcolor=#d6d6d6
| 134143 ||  || — || January 15, 2005 || Socorro || LINEAR || — || align=right | 4.3 km || 
|-id=144 bgcolor=#d6d6d6
| 134144 ||  || — || January 11, 2005 || Socorro || LINEAR || — || align=right | 4.7 km || 
|-id=145 bgcolor=#fefefe
| 134145 ||  || — || January 13, 2005 || Kitt Peak || Spacewatch || — || align=right | 1.4 km || 
|-id=146 bgcolor=#d6d6d6
| 134146 Pronoybiswas ||  ||  || January 13, 2005 || Catalina || CSS || — || align=right | 4.9 km || 
|-id=147 bgcolor=#E9E9E9
| 134147 ||  || — || January 13, 2005 || Kitt Peak || Spacewatch || — || align=right | 3.2 km || 
|-id=148 bgcolor=#d6d6d6
| 134148 ||  || — || January 15, 2005 || Kitt Peak || Spacewatch || KOR || align=right | 2.2 km || 
|-id=149 bgcolor=#d6d6d6
| 134149 ||  || — || January 15, 2005 || Socorro || LINEAR || THM || align=right | 3.1 km || 
|-id=150 bgcolor=#E9E9E9
| 134150 Bralower ||  ||  || January 15, 2005 || Catalina || CSS || MAR || align=right | 2.7 km || 
|-id=151 bgcolor=#E9E9E9
| 134151 ||  || — || January 15, 2005 || Socorro || LINEAR || — || align=right | 5.5 km || 
|-id=152 bgcolor=#d6d6d6
| 134152 ||  || — || January 15, 2005 || Kitt Peak || Spacewatch || KOR || align=right | 2.1 km || 
|-id=153 bgcolor=#d6d6d6
| 134153 ||  || — || January 15, 2005 || Kitt Peak || Spacewatch || — || align=right | 5.3 km || 
|-id=154 bgcolor=#d6d6d6
| 134154 ||  || — || January 13, 2005 || Kitt Peak || Spacewatch || — || align=right | 3.2 km || 
|-id=155 bgcolor=#d6d6d6
| 134155 ||  || — || January 15, 2005 || Kitt Peak || Spacewatch || KAR || align=right | 1.7 km || 
|-id=156 bgcolor=#d6d6d6
| 134156 ||  || — || January 15, 2005 || Kitt Peak || Spacewatch || — || align=right | 2.9 km || 
|-id=157 bgcolor=#d6d6d6
| 134157 ||  || — || January 15, 2005 || Kitt Peak || Spacewatch || — || align=right | 6.8 km || 
|-id=158 bgcolor=#E9E9E9
| 134158 ||  || — || January 15, 2005 || Kitt Peak || Spacewatch || — || align=right | 2.9 km || 
|-id=159 bgcolor=#E9E9E9
| 134159 || 2005 BP || — || January 16, 2005 || Desert Eagle || W. K. Y. Yeung || — || align=right | 2.6 km || 
|-id=160 bgcolor=#d6d6d6
| 134160 Pluis ||  ||  || January 16, 2005 || Uccle || P. De Cat || — || align=right | 6.5 km || 
|-id=161 bgcolor=#E9E9E9
| 134161 ||  || — || January 16, 2005 || Kitt Peak || Spacewatch || — || align=right | 1.6 km || 
|-id=162 bgcolor=#d6d6d6
| 134162 ||  || — || January 16, 2005 || Socorro || LINEAR || — || align=right | 4.1 km || 
|-id=163 bgcolor=#E9E9E9
| 134163 ||  || — || January 16, 2005 || Socorro || LINEAR || AGN || align=right | 2.0 km || 
|-id=164 bgcolor=#d6d6d6
| 134164 ||  || — || January 16, 2005 || Socorro || LINEAR || — || align=right | 7.3 km || 
|-id=165 bgcolor=#E9E9E9
| 134165 ||  || — || January 16, 2005 || Socorro || LINEAR || EUN || align=right | 2.2 km || 
|-id=166 bgcolor=#d6d6d6
| 134166 ||  || — || January 16, 2005 || Socorro || LINEAR || — || align=right | 3.1 km || 
|-id=167 bgcolor=#fefefe
| 134167 ||  || — || January 16, 2005 || Kitt Peak || Spacewatch || — || align=right | 1.2 km || 
|-id=168 bgcolor=#d6d6d6
| 134168 ||  || — || January 16, 2005 || Kitt Peak || Spacewatch || — || align=right | 4.2 km || 
|-id=169 bgcolor=#fefefe
| 134169 Davidcarte ||  ||  || January 17, 2005 || Catalina || CSS || — || align=right | 1.7 km || 
|-id=170 bgcolor=#E9E9E9
| 134170 ||  || — || January 17, 2005 || Socorro || LINEAR || — || align=right | 3.7 km || 
|-id=171 bgcolor=#E9E9E9
| 134171 ||  || — || January 18, 2005 || Kitt Peak || Spacewatch || — || align=right | 2.7 km || 
|-id=172 bgcolor=#d6d6d6
| 134172 ||  || — || January 19, 2005 || Kitt Peak || Spacewatch || HYG || align=right | 6.5 km || 
|-id=173 bgcolor=#E9E9E9
| 134173 ||  || — || February 1, 2005 || Kitt Peak || Spacewatch || — || align=right | 3.1 km || 
|-id=174 bgcolor=#d6d6d6
| 134174 Jameschen ||  ||  || February 1, 2005 || Catalina || CSS || — || align=right | 4.0 km || 
|-id=175 bgcolor=#d6d6d6
| 134175 ||  || — || February 1, 2005 || Kitt Peak || Spacewatch || EOS || align=right | 3.6 km || 
|-id=176 bgcolor=#E9E9E9
| 134176 ||  || — || February 2, 2005 || Socorro || LINEAR || WIT || align=right | 1.5 km || 
|-id=177 bgcolor=#d6d6d6
| 134177 ||  || — || February 2, 2005 || Socorro || LINEAR || THM || align=right | 4.9 km || 
|-id=178 bgcolor=#d6d6d6
| 134178 Markchodas ||  ||  || February 2, 2005 || Catalina || CSS || THM || align=right | 3.2 km || 
|-id=179 bgcolor=#d6d6d6
| 134179 ||  || — || February 3, 2005 || Socorro || LINEAR || — || align=right | 3.4 km || 
|-id=180 bgcolor=#fefefe
| 134180 Nirajinamdar ||  ||  || February 1, 2005 || Catalina || CSS || — || align=right | 1.9 km || 
|-id=181 bgcolor=#E9E9E9
| 134181 ||  || — || February 1, 2005 || Catalina || CSS || — || align=right | 5.3 km || 
|-id=182 bgcolor=#d6d6d6
| 134182 ||  || — || February 1, 2005 || Catalina || CSS || KOR || align=right | 1.8 km || 
|-id=183 bgcolor=#d6d6d6
| 134183 ||  || — || February 2, 2005 || Kitt Peak || Spacewatch || KAR || align=right | 2.0 km || 
|-id=184 bgcolor=#E9E9E9
| 134184 ||  || — || February 4, 2005 || Kitt Peak || Spacewatch || — || align=right | 3.1 km || 
|-id=185 bgcolor=#E9E9E9
| 134185 ||  || — || February 2, 2005 || Catalina || CSS || — || align=right | 2.9 km || 
|-id=186 bgcolor=#d6d6d6
| 134186 ||  || — || February 2, 2005 || Catalina || CSS || HYG || align=right | 4.6 km || 
|-id=187 bgcolor=#d6d6d6
| 134187 ||  || — || February 2, 2005 || Socorro || LINEAR || CRO || align=right | 6.3 km || 
|-id=188 bgcolor=#d6d6d6
| 134188 ||  || — || February 3, 2005 || Socorro || LINEAR || — || align=right | 5.0 km || 
|-id=189 bgcolor=#E9E9E9
| 134189 ||  || — || February 2, 2005 || Socorro || LINEAR || — || align=right | 4.1 km || 
|-id=190 bgcolor=#E9E9E9
| 134190 ||  || — || February 2, 2005 || Socorro || LINEAR || — || align=right | 2.4 km || 
|-id=191 bgcolor=#d6d6d6
| 134191 ||  || — || February 2, 2005 || Catalina || CSS || — || align=right | 3.5 km || 
|-id=192 bgcolor=#d6d6d6
| 134192 ||  || — || February 9, 2005 || Kitt Peak || Spacewatch || KOR || align=right | 2.6 km || 
|-id=193 bgcolor=#d6d6d6
| 134193 ||  || — || February 2, 2005 || Socorro || LINEAR || HIL3:2 || align=right | 8.8 km || 
|-id=194 bgcolor=#d6d6d6
| 134194 ||  || — || February 8, 2005 || Mauna Kea || C. Veillet || KOR || align=right | 2.3 km || 
|-id=195 bgcolor=#d6d6d6
| 134195 ||  || — || February 9, 2005 || Mount Lemmon || Mount Lemmon Survey || — || align=right | 3.8 km || 
|-id=196 bgcolor=#d6d6d6
| 134196 || 2005 DW || — || February 28, 2005 || Socorro || LINEAR || — || align=right | 8.6 km || 
|-id=197 bgcolor=#d6d6d6
| 134197 || 2005 EP || — || March 1, 2005 || Socorro || LINEAR || ALA || align=right | 5.8 km || 
|-id=198 bgcolor=#d6d6d6
| 134198 ||  || — || March 1, 2005 || Kitt Peak || Spacewatch || — || align=right | 5.0 km || 
|-id=199 bgcolor=#d6d6d6
| 134199 ||  || — || March 2, 2005 || Catalina || CSS || — || align=right | 6.3 km || 
|-id=200 bgcolor=#E9E9E9
| 134200 ||  || — || March 3, 2005 || Catalina || CSS || DOR || align=right | 6.0 km || 
|}

134201–134300 

|-bgcolor=#d6d6d6
| 134201 ||  || — || March 2, 2005 || Catalina || CSS || VER || align=right | 7.2 km || 
|-id=202 bgcolor=#fefefe
| 134202 ||  || — || March 4, 2005 || Socorro || LINEAR || V || align=right | 1.1 km || 
|-id=203 bgcolor=#d6d6d6
| 134203 ||  || — || March 4, 2005 || Socorro || LINEAR || KOR || align=right | 2.5 km || 
|-id=204 bgcolor=#E9E9E9
| 134204 ||  || — || March 4, 2005 || Socorro || LINEAR || — || align=right | 1.5 km || 
|-id=205 bgcolor=#fefefe
| 134205 ||  || — || March 11, 2005 || Mount Lemmon || Mount Lemmon Survey || — || align=right | 2.0 km || 
|-id=206 bgcolor=#E9E9E9
| 134206 ||  || — || March 8, 2005 || Socorro || LINEAR || — || align=right | 4.4 km || 
|-id=207 bgcolor=#E9E9E9
| 134207 ||  || — || March 10, 2005 || Catalina || CSS || — || align=right | 3.9 km || 
|-id=208 bgcolor=#d6d6d6
| 134208 ||  || — || March 11, 2005 || Catalina || CSS || EOS || align=right | 4.1 km || 
|-id=209 bgcolor=#d6d6d6
| 134209 ||  || — || May 9, 2005 || Mount Lemmon || Mount Lemmon Survey || — || align=right | 4.8 km || 
|-id=210 bgcolor=#C2E0FF
| 134210 ||  || — || August 9, 2005 || Cerro Tololo || Cerro Tololo Obs. || SDOcritical || align=right | 148 km || 
|-id=211 bgcolor=#d6d6d6
| 134211 ||  || — || August 27, 2005 || Palomar || NEAT || — || align=right | 3.7 km || 
|-id=212 bgcolor=#fefefe
| 134212 ||  || — || September 25, 2005 || Palomar || NEAT || — || align=right | 1.4 km || 
|-id=213 bgcolor=#d6d6d6
| 134213 ||  || — || September 29, 2005 || Palomar || NEAT || — || align=right | 6.2 km || 
|-id=214 bgcolor=#fefefe
| 134214 ||  || — || October 3, 2005 || Kitt Peak || Spacewatch || — || align=right | 3.5 km || 
|-id=215 bgcolor=#d6d6d6
| 134215 ||  || — || October 9, 2005 || Kitt Peak || Spacewatch || — || align=right | 5.6 km || 
|-id=216 bgcolor=#E9E9E9
| 134216 ||  || — || October 22, 2005 || Catalina || CSS || — || align=right | 1.5 km || 
|-id=217 bgcolor=#d6d6d6
| 134217 ||  || — || October 30, 2005 || Kitt Peak || Spacewatch || — || align=right | 7.3 km || 
|-id=218 bgcolor=#d6d6d6
| 134218 ||  || — || October 28, 2005 || Mount Lemmon || Mount Lemmon Survey || — || align=right | 4.1 km || 
|-id=219 bgcolor=#d6d6d6
| 134219 ||  || — || November 5, 2005 || Anderson Mesa || LONEOS || THB || align=right | 6.7 km || 
|-id=220 bgcolor=#E9E9E9
| 134220 ||  || — || November 24, 2005 || Palomar || NEAT || — || align=right | 4.3 km || 
|-id=221 bgcolor=#fefefe
| 134221 ||  || — || November 25, 2005 || Catalina || CSS || — || align=right | 1.7 km || 
|-id=222 bgcolor=#E9E9E9
| 134222 ||  || — || November 30, 2005 || Kitt Peak || Spacewatch || GEF || align=right | 2.6 km || 
|-id=223 bgcolor=#E9E9E9
| 134223 ||  || — || November 28, 2005 || Catalina || CSS || — || align=right | 1.9 km || 
|-id=224 bgcolor=#E9E9E9
| 134224 ||  || — || December 1, 2005 || Kitt Peak || Spacewatch || — || align=right | 4.6 km || 
|-id=225 bgcolor=#d6d6d6
| 134225 ||  || — || December 4, 2005 || Kitt Peak || Spacewatch || CHA || align=right | 3.4 km || 
|-id=226 bgcolor=#d6d6d6
| 134226 ||  || — || December 6, 2005 || Kitt Peak || Spacewatch || — || align=right | 4.5 km || 
|-id=227 bgcolor=#fefefe
| 134227 ||  || — || December 14, 2005 || Anderson Mesa || LONEOS || H || align=right | 1.7 km || 
|-id=228 bgcolor=#E9E9E9
| 134228 ||  || — || December 6, 2005 || Anderson Mesa || LONEOS || — || align=right | 2.9 km || 
|-id=229 bgcolor=#d6d6d6
| 134229 ||  || — || December 21, 2005 || Kitt Peak || Spacewatch || — || align=right | 3.8 km || 
|-id=230 bgcolor=#d6d6d6
| 134230 ||  || — || December 24, 2005 || Kitt Peak || Spacewatch || — || align=right | 4.4 km || 
|-id=231 bgcolor=#d6d6d6
| 134231 ||  || — || December 25, 2005 || Kitt Peak || Spacewatch || EOS || align=right | 3.4 km || 
|-id=232 bgcolor=#fefefe
| 134232 ||  || — || December 25, 2005 || Kitt Peak || Spacewatch || — || align=right | 1.2 km || 
|-id=233 bgcolor=#d6d6d6
| 134233 ||  || — || December 24, 2005 || Kitt Peak || Spacewatch || 3:2 || align=right | 6.2 km || 
|-id=234 bgcolor=#fefefe
| 134234 ||  || — || December 24, 2005 || Kitt Peak || Spacewatch || — || align=right | 2.0 km || 
|-id=235 bgcolor=#d6d6d6
| 134235 ||  || — || December 26, 2005 || Kitt Peak || Spacewatch || — || align=right | 6.0 km || 
|-id=236 bgcolor=#E9E9E9
| 134236 ||  || — || December 26, 2005 || Mount Lemmon || Mount Lemmon Survey || HOF || align=right | 5.1 km || 
|-id=237 bgcolor=#d6d6d6
| 134237 ||  || — || December 25, 2005 || Kitt Peak || Spacewatch || KOR || align=right | 2.1 km || 
|-id=238 bgcolor=#fefefe
| 134238 ||  || — || December 27, 2005 || Catalina || CSS || — || align=right | 1.5 km || 
|-id=239 bgcolor=#E9E9E9
| 134239 ||  || — || December 28, 2005 || Mount Lemmon || Mount Lemmon Survey || — || align=right | 4.6 km || 
|-id=240 bgcolor=#fefefe
| 134240 ||  || — || December 27, 2005 || Catalina || CSS || FLO || align=right | 1.8 km || 
|-id=241 bgcolor=#fefefe
| 134241 ||  || — || December 30, 2005 || Catalina || CSS || H || align=right data-sort-value="0.97" | 970 m || 
|-id=242 bgcolor=#fefefe
| 134242 ||  || — || December 27, 2005 || Mount Lemmon || Mount Lemmon Survey || — || align=right | 1.0 km || 
|-id=243 bgcolor=#E9E9E9
| 134243 ||  || — || December 30, 2005 || Mount Lemmon || Mount Lemmon Survey || — || align=right | 3.8 km || 
|-id=244 bgcolor=#E9E9E9
| 134244 De Young ||  ||  || January 6, 2006 || Calvin-Rehoboth || L. A. Molnar || — || align=right | 3.5 km || 
|-id=245 bgcolor=#E9E9E9
| 134245 ||  || — || January 4, 2006 || Catalina || CSS || POS || align=right | 5.5 km || 
|-id=246 bgcolor=#fefefe
| 134246 ||  || — || January 5, 2006 || Mount Lemmon || Mount Lemmon Survey || — || align=right | 1.6 km || 
|-id=247 bgcolor=#E9E9E9
| 134247 ||  || — || January 5, 2006 || Mount Lemmon || Mount Lemmon Survey || — || align=right | 4.5 km || 
|-id=248 bgcolor=#E9E9E9
| 134248 ||  || — || January 2, 2006 || Catalina || CSS || EUN || align=right | 1.9 km || 
|-id=249 bgcolor=#fefefe
| 134249 ||  || — || January 5, 2006 || Catalina || CSS || FLO || align=right data-sort-value="0.94" | 940 m || 
|-id=250 bgcolor=#fefefe
| 134250 ||  || — || January 5, 2006 || Catalina || CSS || PHO || align=right | 1.1 km || 
|-id=251 bgcolor=#C2FFFF
| 134251 ||  || — || January 6, 2006 || Mount Lemmon || Mount Lemmon Survey || L5 || align=right | 18 km || 
|-id=252 bgcolor=#fefefe
| 134252 ||  || — || January 3, 2006 || Socorro || LINEAR || — || align=right | 1.4 km || 
|-id=253 bgcolor=#fefefe
| 134253 ||  || — || January 6, 2006 || Mount Lemmon || Mount Lemmon Survey || — || align=right | 1.3 km || 
|-id=254 bgcolor=#d6d6d6
| 134254 ||  || — || January 4, 2006 || Socorro || LINEAR || ALA || align=right | 9.5 km || 
|-id=255 bgcolor=#E9E9E9
| 134255 ||  || — || January 6, 2006 || Anderson Mesa || LONEOS || — || align=right | 3.0 km || 
|-id=256 bgcolor=#d6d6d6
| 134256 ||  || — || January 6, 2006 || Mount Lemmon || Mount Lemmon Survey || — || align=right | 9.9 km || 
|-id=257 bgcolor=#E9E9E9
| 134257 ||  || — || January 7, 2006 || Mount Lemmon || Mount Lemmon Survey || — || align=right | 2.2 km || 
|-id=258 bgcolor=#E9E9E9
| 134258 ||  || — || January 7, 2006 || Anderson Mesa || LONEOS || — || align=right | 4.2 km || 
|-id=259 bgcolor=#E9E9E9
| 134259 ||  || — || January 20, 2006 || Catalina || CSS || — || align=right | 3.1 km || 
|-id=260 bgcolor=#E9E9E9
| 134260 ||  || — || January 21, 2006 || Palomar || NEAT || — || align=right | 3.1 km || 
|-id=261 bgcolor=#fefefe
| 134261 ||  || — || January 22, 2006 || Mount Lemmon || Mount Lemmon Survey || — || align=right | 1.3 km || 
|-id=262 bgcolor=#E9E9E9
| 134262 ||  || — || January 23, 2006 || Catalina || CSS || — || align=right | 3.9 km || 
|-id=263 bgcolor=#d6d6d6
| 134263 ||  || — || January 23, 2006 || Socorro || LINEAR || 7:4 || align=right | 7.8 km || 
|-id=264 bgcolor=#d6d6d6
| 134264 ||  || — || January 20, 2006 || Kitt Peak || Spacewatch || — || align=right | 5.1 km || 
|-id=265 bgcolor=#d6d6d6
| 134265 ||  || — || January 24, 2006 || Socorro || LINEAR || EOS || align=right | 3.5 km || 
|-id=266 bgcolor=#d6d6d6
| 134266 ||  || — || January 26, 2006 || Mount Lemmon || Mount Lemmon Survey || — || align=right | 4.6 km || 
|-id=267 bgcolor=#d6d6d6
| 134267 ||  || — || January 26, 2006 || Catalina || CSS || Tj (2.96) || align=right | 5.9 km || 
|-id=268 bgcolor=#E9E9E9
| 134268 ||  || — || January 25, 2006 || Kitt Peak || Spacewatch || GEF || align=right | 2.1 km || 
|-id=269 bgcolor=#C2FFFF
| 134269 ||  || — || January 26, 2006 || Kitt Peak || Spacewatch || L5 || align=right | 16 km || 
|-id=270 bgcolor=#E9E9E9
| 134270 ||  || — || January 26, 2006 || Kitt Peak || Spacewatch || — || align=right | 3.4 km || 
|-id=271 bgcolor=#d6d6d6
| 134271 ||  || — || January 28, 2006 || Mount Lemmon || Mount Lemmon Survey || — || align=right | 5.0 km || 
|-id=272 bgcolor=#E9E9E9
| 134272 ||  || — || January 28, 2006 || 7300 Observatory || W. K. Y. Yeung || — || align=right | 4.1 km || 
|-id=273 bgcolor=#E9E9E9
| 134273 ||  || — || January 25, 2006 || Kitt Peak || Spacewatch || — || align=right | 1.8 km || 
|-id=274 bgcolor=#E9E9E9
| 134274 ||  || — || January 26, 2006 || Kitt Peak || Spacewatch || VIB || align=right | 2.7 km || 
|-id=275 bgcolor=#E9E9E9
| 134275 ||  || — || January 26, 2006 || Anderson Mesa || LONEOS || JUN || align=right | 2.1 km || 
|-id=276 bgcolor=#d6d6d6
| 134276 ||  || — || January 31, 2006 || Kitt Peak || Spacewatch || — || align=right | 4.0 km || 
|-id=277 bgcolor=#d6d6d6
| 134277 ||  || — || January 31, 2006 || Kitt Peak || Spacewatch || — || align=right | 4.2 km || 
|-id=278 bgcolor=#d6d6d6
| 134278 ||  || — || January 31, 2006 || Kitt Peak || Spacewatch || — || align=right | 4.3 km || 
|-id=279 bgcolor=#fefefe
| 134279 ||  || — || January 31, 2006 || Kitt Peak || Spacewatch || — || align=right | 1.1 km || 
|-id=280 bgcolor=#d6d6d6
| 134280 ||  || — || January 28, 2006 || Anderson Mesa || LONEOS || — || align=right | 5.8 km || 
|-id=281 bgcolor=#d6d6d6
| 134281 ||  || — || February 1, 2006 || Mount Lemmon || Mount Lemmon Survey || VER || align=right | 4.3 km || 
|-id=282 bgcolor=#d6d6d6
| 134282 ||  || — || February 1, 2006 || Catalina || CSS || ALA || align=right | 6.7 km || 
|-id=283 bgcolor=#E9E9E9
| 134283 ||  || — || February 2, 2006 || Mount Lemmon || Mount Lemmon Survey || — || align=right | 1.6 km || 
|-id=284 bgcolor=#d6d6d6
| 134284 ||  || — || February 2, 2006 || Kitt Peak || Spacewatch || EUP || align=right | 6.4 km || 
|-id=285 bgcolor=#fefefe
| 134285 ||  || — || February 2, 2006 || Mount Lemmon || Mount Lemmon Survey || FLO || align=right | 1.0 km || 
|-id=286 bgcolor=#d6d6d6
| 134286 ||  || — || February 3, 2006 || Kitt Peak || Spacewatch || NAE || align=right | 5.3 km || 
|-id=287 bgcolor=#d6d6d6
| 134287 ||  || — || February 1, 2006 || Catalina || CSS || — || align=right | 7.7 km || 
|-id=288 bgcolor=#E9E9E9
| 134288 ||  || — || February 10, 2006 || Catalina || CSS || — || align=right | 2.5 km || 
|-id=289 bgcolor=#fefefe
| 134289 ||  || — || February 12, 2006 || Palomar || NEAT || — || align=right | 1.6 km || 
|-id=290 bgcolor=#fefefe
| 134290 ||  || — || February 20, 2006 || Catalina || CSS || — || align=right | 1.8 km || 
|-id=291 bgcolor=#d6d6d6
| 134291 ||  || — || February 20, 2006 || Catalina || CSS || — || align=right | 5.3 km || 
|-id=292 bgcolor=#fefefe
| 134292 Edwardhall ||  ||  || February 20, 2006 || Mount Lemmon || Mount Lemmon Survey || — || align=right | 1.4 km || 
|-id=293 bgcolor=#E9E9E9
| 134293 ||  || — || February 20, 2006 || Mount Lemmon || Mount Lemmon Survey || — || align=right | 6.5 km || 
|-id=294 bgcolor=#E9E9E9
| 134294 ||  || — || February 22, 2006 || Palomar || NEAT || — || align=right | 5.0 km || 
|-id=295 bgcolor=#E9E9E9
| 134295 ||  || — || February 22, 2006 || Catalina || CSS || — || align=right | 5.1 km || 
|-id=296 bgcolor=#fefefe
| 134296 ||  || — || February 20, 2006 || Catalina || CSS || — || align=right | 1.4 km || 
|-id=297 bgcolor=#fefefe
| 134297 ||  || — || February 24, 2006 || Mount Lemmon || Mount Lemmon Survey || — || align=right | 1.5 km || 
|-id=298 bgcolor=#E9E9E9
| 134298 ||  || — || February 26, 2006 || Catalina || CSS || — || align=right | 4.3 km || 
|-id=299 bgcolor=#fefefe
| 134299 ||  || — || February 23, 2006 || Kitt Peak || Spacewatch || — || align=right | 1.3 km || 
|-id=300 bgcolor=#fefefe
| 134300 || 2109 P-L || — || September 24, 1960 || Palomar || PLS || — || align=right | 1.9 km || 
|}

134301–134400 

|-bgcolor=#E9E9E9
| 134301 || 2141 P-L || — || September 24, 1960 || Palomar || PLS || — || align=right | 2.1 km || 
|-id=302 bgcolor=#d6d6d6
| 134302 || 2634 P-L || — || September 24, 1960 || Palomar || PLS || — || align=right | 4.1 km || 
|-id=303 bgcolor=#fefefe
| 134303 || 2701 P-L || — || September 24, 1960 || Palomar || PLS || — || align=right | 3.9 km || 
|-id=304 bgcolor=#fefefe
| 134304 || 2716 P-L || — || September 24, 1960 || Palomar || PLS || NYS || align=right | 1.2 km || 
|-id=305 bgcolor=#d6d6d6
| 134305 || 2738 P-L || — || September 24, 1960 || Palomar || PLS || — || align=right | 5.9 km || 
|-id=306 bgcolor=#d6d6d6
| 134306 || 2807 P-L || — || September 24, 1960 || Palomar || PLS || — || align=right | 4.8 km || 
|-id=307 bgcolor=#fefefe
| 134307 || 2849 P-L || — || September 24, 1960 || Palomar || PLS || MAS || align=right data-sort-value="0.83" | 830 m || 
|-id=308 bgcolor=#E9E9E9
| 134308 || 4183 P-L || — || September 24, 1960 || Palomar || PLS || — || align=right | 1.9 km || 
|-id=309 bgcolor=#E9E9E9
| 134309 || 4552 P-L || — || September 24, 1960 || Palomar || PLS || EUN || align=right | 1.8 km || 
|-id=310 bgcolor=#E9E9E9
| 134310 || 4698 P-L || — || September 24, 1960 || Palomar || PLS || ADE || align=right | 3.2 km || 
|-id=311 bgcolor=#E9E9E9
| 134311 || 4704 P-L || — || September 24, 1960 || Palomar || PLS || — || align=right | 2.4 km || 
|-id=312 bgcolor=#E9E9E9
| 134312 || 4797 P-L || — || September 24, 1960 || Palomar || PLS || GEF || align=right | 2.4 km || 
|-id=313 bgcolor=#fefefe
| 134313 || 4816 P-L || — || September 24, 1960 || Palomar || PLS || EUT || align=right data-sort-value="0.79" | 790 m || 
|-id=314 bgcolor=#fefefe
| 134314 || 6362 P-L || — || September 24, 1960 || Palomar || PLS || — || align=right | 1.2 km || 
|-id=315 bgcolor=#fefefe
| 134315 || 7501 P-L || — || October 17, 1960 || Palomar || PLS || — || align=right | 4.5 km || 
|-id=316 bgcolor=#fefefe
| 134316 || 9579 P-L || — || October 17, 1960 || Palomar || PLS || FLO || align=right | 2.2 km || 
|-id=317 bgcolor=#fefefe
| 134317 || 4117 T-1 || — || March 26, 1971 || Palomar || PLS || FLO || align=right | 1.4 km || 
|-id=318 bgcolor=#fefefe
| 134318 || 1141 T-2 || — || September 29, 1973 || Palomar || PLS || NYS || align=right | 1.0 km || 
|-id=319 bgcolor=#fefefe
| 134319 || 1205 T-2 || — || September 29, 1973 || Palomar || PLS || V || align=right | 1.2 km || 
|-id=320 bgcolor=#fefefe
| 134320 || 1292 T-2 || — || September 29, 1973 || Palomar || PLS || NYS || align=right data-sort-value="0.83" | 830 m || 
|-id=321 bgcolor=#fefefe
| 134321 || 1316 T-2 || — || September 29, 1973 || Palomar || PLS || MAS || align=right | 1.2 km || 
|-id=322 bgcolor=#fefefe
| 134322 || 1471 T-2 || — || September 29, 1973 || Palomar || PLS || NYS || align=right data-sort-value="0.99" | 990 m || 
|-id=323 bgcolor=#fefefe
| 134323 || 1564 T-2 || — || September 24, 1973 || Palomar || PLS || FLO || align=right | 2.2 km || 
|-id=324 bgcolor=#fefefe
| 134324 || 1619 T-2 || — || September 24, 1973 || Palomar || PLS || — || align=right | 1.3 km || 
|-id=325 bgcolor=#fefefe
| 134325 || 4492 T-2 || — || September 30, 1973 || Palomar || PLS || FLO || align=right | 1.1 km || 
|-id=326 bgcolor=#E9E9E9
| 134326 || 2251 T-3 || — || October 16, 1977 || Palomar || PLS || EUN || align=right | 3.5 km || 
|-id=327 bgcolor=#d6d6d6
| 134327 || 2304 T-3 || — || October 16, 1977 || Palomar || PLS || — || align=right | 4.4 km || 
|-id=328 bgcolor=#fefefe
| 134328 || 2371 T-3 || — || October 16, 1977 || Palomar || PLS || V || align=right | 1.5 km || 
|-id=329 bgcolor=#C2FFFF
| 134329 Cycnos || 2377 T-3 ||  || October 16, 1977 || Palomar || PLS || L5 || align=right | 18 km || 
|-id=330 bgcolor=#fefefe
| 134330 || 3055 T-3 || — || October 16, 1977 || Palomar || PLS || — || align=right | 1.2 km || 
|-id=331 bgcolor=#d6d6d6
| 134331 || 3139 T-3 || — || October 16, 1977 || Palomar || PLS || KOR || align=right | 2.9 km || 
|-id=332 bgcolor=#fefefe
| 134332 || 3323 T-3 || — || October 16, 1977 || Palomar || PLS || FLO || align=right | 1.4 km || 
|-id=333 bgcolor=#fefefe
| 134333 || 3345 T-3 || — || October 16, 1977 || Palomar || PLS || MAS || align=right | 1.4 km || 
|-id=334 bgcolor=#fefefe
| 134334 || 3391 T-3 || — || October 16, 1977 || Palomar || PLS || NYS || align=right data-sort-value="0.93" | 930 m || 
|-id=335 bgcolor=#E9E9E9
| 134335 || 4112 T-3 || — || October 16, 1977 || Palomar || PLS || — || align=right | 2.5 km || 
|-id=336 bgcolor=#fefefe
| 134336 || 4592 T-3 || — || October 16, 1977 || Palomar || PLS || NYS || align=right data-sort-value="0.99" | 990 m || 
|-id=337 bgcolor=#fefefe
| 134337 || 4680 T-3 || — || October 17, 1977 || Palomar || PLS || — || align=right | 4.8 km || 
|-id=338 bgcolor=#fefefe
| 134338 || 5080 T-3 || — || October 16, 1977 || Palomar || PLS || FLO || align=right data-sort-value="0.90" | 900 m || 
|-id=339 bgcolor=#E9E9E9
| 134339 || 5628 T-3 || — || October 16, 1977 || Palomar || PLS || — || align=right | 3.2 km || 
|-id=340 bgcolor=#C2E0FF
| 134340 Pluto || — ||  || January 23, 1930 || Flagstaff || C. W. Tombaugh || plutinomoonslow || align=right | 2377 km || 
|-id=341 bgcolor=#FA8072
| 134341 || 1979 MA || — || June 25, 1979 || Siding Spring || E. F. Helin, S. J. Bus || — || align=right | 2.7 km || 
|-id=342 bgcolor=#fefefe
| 134342 ||  || — || June 25, 1979 || Siding Spring || E. F. Helin, S. J. Bus || — || align=right | 1.5 km || 
|-id=343 bgcolor=#fefefe
| 134343 ||  || — || March 2, 1981 || Siding Spring || S. J. Bus || — || align=right | 1.6 km || 
|-id=344 bgcolor=#E9E9E9
| 134344 ||  || — || September 24, 1989 || La Silla || H. Debehogne || — || align=right | 4.3 km || 
|-id=345 bgcolor=#d6d6d6
| 134345 ||  || — || October 16, 1990 || La Silla || E. W. Elst || — || align=right | 6.5 km || 
|-id=346 bgcolor=#fefefe
| 134346 Pinatubo ||  ||  || August 2, 1991 || La Silla || E. W. Elst || — || align=right | 1.9 km || 
|-id=347 bgcolor=#fefefe
| 134347 ||  || — || September 2, 1992 || La Silla || E. W. Elst || FLO || align=right | 1.2 km || 
|-id=348 bgcolor=#d6d6d6
| 134348 Klemperer ||  ||  || October 31, 1992 || Tautenburg Observatory || F. Börngen || — || align=right | 4.5 km || 
|-id=349 bgcolor=#d6d6d6
| 134349 ||  || — || March 17, 1993 || La Silla || UESAC || — || align=right | 5.9 km || 
|-id=350 bgcolor=#E9E9E9
| 134350 ||  || — || March 19, 1993 || La Silla || UESAC || — || align=right | 1.5 km || 
|-id=351 bgcolor=#E9E9E9
| 134351 ||  || — || September 15, 1993 || La Silla || E. W. Elst || — || align=right | 4.1 km || 
|-id=352 bgcolor=#E9E9E9
| 134352 ||  || — || October 9, 1993 || Kitt Peak || Spacewatch || — || align=right | 2.8 km || 
|-id=353 bgcolor=#E9E9E9
| 134353 ||  || — || October 9, 1993 || La Silla || E. W. Elst || — || align=right | 5.1 km || 
|-id=354 bgcolor=#E9E9E9
| 134354 ||  || — || October 20, 1993 || La Silla || E. W. Elst || — || align=right | 3.5 km || 
|-id=355 bgcolor=#d6d6d6
| 134355 ||  || — || May 5, 1994 || Kitt Peak || Spacewatch || — || align=right | 4.2 km || 
|-id=356 bgcolor=#E9E9E9
| 134356 ||  || — || August 10, 1994 || La Silla || E. W. Elst || — || align=right | 3.3 km || 
|-id=357 bgcolor=#E9E9E9
| 134357 ||  || — || August 10, 1994 || La Silla || E. W. Elst || — || align=right | 1.6 km || 
|-id=358 bgcolor=#E9E9E9
| 134358 ||  || — || August 10, 1994 || La Silla || E. W. Elst || — || align=right | 1.7 km || 
|-id=359 bgcolor=#E9E9E9
| 134359 ||  || — || August 12, 1994 || La Silla || E. W. Elst || — || align=right | 1.5 km || 
|-id=360 bgcolor=#E9E9E9
| 134360 ||  || — || August 10, 1994 || La Silla || E. W. Elst || — || align=right | 1.8 km || 
|-id=361 bgcolor=#E9E9E9
| 134361 || 1994 RF || — || September 4, 1994 || Farra d'Isonzo || Farra d'Isonzo || — || align=right | 4.9 km || 
|-id=362 bgcolor=#E9E9E9
| 134362 ||  || — || October 2, 1994 || Kitt Peak || Spacewatch || — || align=right | 2.6 km || 
|-id=363 bgcolor=#E9E9E9
| 134363 ||  || — || November 7, 1994 || Kushiro || S. Ueda, H. Kaneda || — || align=right | 4.1 km || 
|-id=364 bgcolor=#fefefe
| 134364 ||  || — || February 21, 1995 || Kitt Peak || Spacewatch || — || align=right | 1.3 km || 
|-id=365 bgcolor=#fefefe
| 134365 ||  || — || April 2, 1995 || Kitt Peak || Spacewatch || — || align=right | 1.3 km || 
|-id=366 bgcolor=#fefefe
| 134366 || 1995 LC || — || June 1, 1995 || Siding Spring || R. H. McNaught || H || align=right | 1.3 km || 
|-id=367 bgcolor=#d6d6d6
| 134367 ||  || — || July 25, 1995 || Kitt Peak || Spacewatch || EOS || align=right | 3.6 km || 
|-id=368 bgcolor=#d6d6d6
| 134368 ||  || — || July 26, 1995 || Kitt Peak || Spacewatch || — || align=right | 5.0 km || 
|-id=369 bgcolor=#d6d6d6
| 134369 Sahara || 1995 QE ||  || August 17, 1995 || Colleverde || V. S. Casulli || — || align=right | 4.4 km || 
|-id=370 bgcolor=#fefefe
| 134370 ||  || — || August 19, 1995 || Xinglong || SCAP || V || align=right | 1.1 km || 
|-id=371 bgcolor=#FA8072
| 134371 || 1995 RH || — || September 3, 1995 || Siding Spring || R. H. McNaught || PHO || align=right | 2.0 km || 
|-id=372 bgcolor=#d6d6d6
| 134372 ||  || — || September 25, 1995 || Catalina Station || T. B. Spahr || Tj (2.97) || align=right | 5.4 km || 
|-id=373 bgcolor=#fefefe
| 134373 ||  || — || September 18, 1995 || Kitt Peak || Spacewatch || MAS || align=right | 1.2 km || 
|-id=374 bgcolor=#d6d6d6
| 134374 ||  || — || September 18, 1995 || Kitt Peak || Spacewatch || — || align=right | 4.7 km || 
|-id=375 bgcolor=#d6d6d6
| 134375 ||  || — || September 18, 1995 || Kitt Peak || Spacewatch || HYG || align=right | 5.0 km || 
|-id=376 bgcolor=#fefefe
| 134376 ||  || — || September 19, 1995 || Kitt Peak || Spacewatch || — || align=right | 1.3 km || 
|-id=377 bgcolor=#d6d6d6
| 134377 ||  || — || September 25, 1995 || Kitt Peak || Spacewatch || — || align=right | 4.6 km || 
|-id=378 bgcolor=#d6d6d6
| 134378 ||  || — || September 22, 1995 || Kitt Peak || Spacewatch || — || align=right | 6.4 km || 
|-id=379 bgcolor=#d6d6d6
| 134379 ||  || — || October 23, 1995 || Kitt Peak || Spacewatch || — || align=right | 5.1 km || 
|-id=380 bgcolor=#d6d6d6
| 134380 ||  || — || December 28, 1995 || Siding Spring || R. H. McNaught || Tj (2.95) || align=right | 7.3 km || 
|-id=381 bgcolor=#d6d6d6
| 134381 ||  || — || January 13, 1996 || Kitt Peak || Spacewatch || THM || align=right | 3.8 km || 
|-id=382 bgcolor=#E9E9E9
| 134382 ||  || — || February 10, 1996 || Kitt Peak || Spacewatch || EUN || align=right | 2.9 km || 
|-id=383 bgcolor=#E9E9E9
| 134383 ||  || — || February 10, 1996 || Xinglong || SCAP || — || align=right | 1.8 km || 
|-id=384 bgcolor=#E9E9E9
| 134384 ||  || — || March 19, 1996 || Kitt Peak || Spacewatch || RAF || align=right | 2.1 km || 
|-id=385 bgcolor=#fefefe
| 134385 ||  || — || September 13, 1996 || Haleakala || NEAT || — || align=right | 1.5 km || 
|-id=386 bgcolor=#fefefe
| 134386 ||  || — || September 20, 1996 || Kitt Peak || Spacewatch || — || align=right | 1.3 km || 
|-id=387 bgcolor=#fefefe
| 134387 ||  || — || October 4, 1996 || Kitt Peak || Spacewatch || — || align=right | 1.3 km || 
|-id=388 bgcolor=#fefefe
| 134388 ||  || — || October 4, 1996 || Kitt Peak || Spacewatch || FLO || align=right | 1.1 km || 
|-id=389 bgcolor=#d6d6d6
| 134389 ||  || — || November 10, 1996 || Sudbury || D. di Cicco || THM || align=right | 7.6 km || 
|-id=390 bgcolor=#fefefe
| 134390 ||  || — || November 5, 1996 || Kitt Peak || Spacewatch || V || align=right | 1.00 km || 
|-id=391 bgcolor=#d6d6d6
| 134391 ||  || — || December 2, 1996 || Kitt Peak || Spacewatch || — || align=right | 5.5 km || 
|-id=392 bgcolor=#fefefe
| 134392 ||  || — || December 5, 1996 || Kitt Peak || Spacewatch || NYS || align=right data-sort-value="0.97" | 970 m || 
|-id=393 bgcolor=#d6d6d6
| 134393 ||  || — || January 10, 1997 || Kitt Peak || Spacewatch || HYG || align=right | 5.8 km || 
|-id=394 bgcolor=#fefefe
| 134394 ||  || — || January 31, 1997 || Kitt Peak || Spacewatch || V || align=right | 1.2 km || 
|-id=395 bgcolor=#E9E9E9
| 134395 ||  || — || April 2, 1997 || Socorro || LINEAR || — || align=right | 3.7 km || 
|-id=396 bgcolor=#E9E9E9
| 134396 ||  || — || April 30, 1997 || Socorro || LINEAR || — || align=right | 1.8 km || 
|-id=397 bgcolor=#E9E9E9
| 134397 ||  || — || May 3, 1997 || La Silla || E. W. Elst || — || align=right | 3.6 km || 
|-id=398 bgcolor=#E9E9E9
| 134398 ||  || — || May 3, 1997 || La Silla || E. W. Elst || — || align=right | 3.0 km || 
|-id=399 bgcolor=#E9E9E9
| 134399 ||  || — || June 1, 1997 || Kitt Peak || Spacewatch || — || align=right | 3.4 km || 
|-id=400 bgcolor=#E9E9E9
| 134400 ||  || — || June 8, 1997 || La Silla || E. W. Elst || — || align=right | 3.4 km || 
|}

134401–134500 

|-bgcolor=#E9E9E9
| 134401 ||  || — || June 30, 1997 || Kitt Peak || Spacewatch || — || align=right | 2.7 km || 
|-id=402 bgcolor=#E9E9E9
| 134402 Ieshimatoshiaki || 1997 RG ||  || September 1, 1997 || Yatsuka || H. Abe || — || align=right | 2.2 km || 
|-id=403 bgcolor=#E9E9E9
| 134403 || 1997 SC || — || September 16, 1997 || Modra || A. Galád, A. Pravda || DOR || align=right | 4.6 km || 
|-id=404 bgcolor=#E9E9E9
| 134404 ||  || — || October 29, 1997 || Goodricke-Pigott || R. A. Tucker || — || align=right | 2.8 km || 
|-id=405 bgcolor=#d6d6d6
| 134405 ||  || — || November 29, 1997 || Kitt Peak || Spacewatch || 628 || align=right | 2.6 km || 
|-id=406 bgcolor=#fefefe
| 134406 || 1998 BF || — || January 17, 1998 || Prescott || P. G. Comba || — || align=right | 1.4 km || 
|-id=407 bgcolor=#d6d6d6
| 134407 ||  || — || January 22, 1998 || Kitt Peak || Spacewatch || — || align=right | 4.7 km || 
|-id=408 bgcolor=#fefefe
| 134408 ||  || — || February 23, 1998 || Kitt Peak || Spacewatch || — || align=right | 1.3 km || 
|-id=409 bgcolor=#fefefe
| 134409 || 1998 FV || — || March 18, 1998 || Kitt Peak || Spacewatch || NYS || align=right | 1.3 km || 
|-id=410 bgcolor=#d6d6d6
| 134410 ||  || — || March 20, 1998 || Kitt Peak || Spacewatch || HYG || align=right | 4.4 km || 
|-id=411 bgcolor=#d6d6d6
| 134411 ||  || — || March 20, 1998 || Kitt Peak || Spacewatch || EOS || align=right | 3.1 km || 
|-id=412 bgcolor=#fefefe
| 134412 ||  || — || March 20, 1998 || Socorro || LINEAR || V || align=right | 1.5 km || 
|-id=413 bgcolor=#fefefe
| 134413 ||  || — || March 24, 1998 || Socorro || LINEAR || NYS || align=right | 4.2 km || 
|-id=414 bgcolor=#fefefe
| 134414 ||  || — || April 20, 1998 || Kitt Peak || Spacewatch || — || align=right | 1.6 km || 
|-id=415 bgcolor=#fefefe
| 134415 ||  || — || April 20, 1998 || Socorro || LINEAR || CHL || align=right | 3.4 km || 
|-id=416 bgcolor=#fefefe
| 134416 ||  || — || April 20, 1998 || Socorro || LINEAR || NYS || align=right | 1.3 km || 
|-id=417 bgcolor=#fefefe
| 134417 ||  || — || April 21, 1998 || Socorro || LINEAR || — || align=right | 2.0 km || 
|-id=418 bgcolor=#fefefe
| 134418 ||  || — || April 19, 1998 || Socorro || LINEAR || — || align=right | 1.7 km || 
|-id=419 bgcolor=#C2FFFF
| 134419 Hippothous ||  ||  || June 28, 1998 || La Silla || E. W. Elst || L5 || align=right | 17 km || 
|-id=420 bgcolor=#fefefe
| 134420 ||  || — || July 26, 1998 || La Silla || E. W. Elst || — || align=right | 1.8 km || 
|-id=421 bgcolor=#E9E9E9
| 134421 ||  || — || August 17, 1998 || Socorro || LINEAR || — || align=right | 7.6 km || 
|-id=422 bgcolor=#fefefe
| 134422 ||  || — || August 17, 1998 || Socorro || LINEAR || H || align=right | 1.4 km || 
|-id=423 bgcolor=#E9E9E9
| 134423 ||  || — || August 22, 1998 || Xinglong || SCAP || — || align=right | 1.7 km || 
|-id=424 bgcolor=#E9E9E9
| 134424 ||  || — || August 17, 1998 || Socorro || LINEAR || — || align=right | 1.9 km || 
|-id=425 bgcolor=#E9E9E9
| 134425 ||  || — || August 24, 1998 || Socorro || LINEAR || — || align=right | 2.7 km || 
|-id=426 bgcolor=#E9E9E9
| 134426 ||  || — || August 25, 1998 || La Silla || E. W. Elst || — || align=right | 2.3 km || 
|-id=427 bgcolor=#E9E9E9
| 134427 ||  || — || August 17, 1998 || Socorro || LINEAR || — || align=right | 5.3 km || 
|-id=428 bgcolor=#E9E9E9
| 134428 ||  || — || September 14, 1998 || Socorro || LINEAR || — || align=right | 1.9 km || 
|-id=429 bgcolor=#d6d6d6
| 134429 ||  || — || September 15, 1998 || Anderson Mesa || LONEOS || SHU3:2 || align=right | 10 km || 
|-id=430 bgcolor=#E9E9E9
| 134430 ||  || — || September 14, 1998 || Socorro || LINEAR || — || align=right | 1.8 km || 
|-id=431 bgcolor=#E9E9E9
| 134431 ||  || — || September 14, 1998 || Socorro || LINEAR || — || align=right | 1.6 km || 
|-id=432 bgcolor=#E9E9E9
| 134432 ||  || — || September 14, 1998 || Socorro || LINEAR || — || align=right | 1.6 km || 
|-id=433 bgcolor=#E9E9E9
| 134433 ||  || — || September 14, 1998 || Socorro || LINEAR || MAR || align=right | 1.8 km || 
|-id=434 bgcolor=#E9E9E9
| 134434 ||  || — || September 14, 1998 || Socorro || LINEAR || — || align=right | 1.7 km || 
|-id=435 bgcolor=#E9E9E9
| 134435 ||  || — || September 14, 1998 || Socorro || LINEAR || — || align=right | 1.6 km || 
|-id=436 bgcolor=#E9E9E9
| 134436 ||  || — || September 14, 1998 || Socorro || LINEAR || — || align=right | 1.6 km || 
|-id=437 bgcolor=#E9E9E9
| 134437 ||  || — || September 14, 1998 || Socorro || LINEAR || — || align=right | 1.4 km || 
|-id=438 bgcolor=#E9E9E9
| 134438 ||  || — || September 14, 1998 || Socorro || LINEAR || — || align=right | 1.8 km || 
|-id=439 bgcolor=#E9E9E9
| 134439 ||  || — || September 14, 1998 || Socorro || LINEAR || — || align=right | 2.0 km || 
|-id=440 bgcolor=#fefefe
| 134440 ||  || — || September 18, 1998 || Socorro || LINEAR || H || align=right | 1.1 km || 
|-id=441 bgcolor=#E9E9E9
| 134441 ||  || — || September 27, 1998 || Ondřejov || L. Kotková || — || align=right | 1.9 km || 
|-id=442 bgcolor=#E9E9E9
| 134442 ||  || — || September 26, 1998 || Kitt Peak || Spacewatch || — || align=right | 2.0 km || 
|-id=443 bgcolor=#E9E9E9
| 134443 ||  || — || September 16, 1998 || Anderson Mesa || LONEOS || — || align=right | 1.8 km || 
|-id=444 bgcolor=#E9E9E9
| 134444 ||  || — || September 29, 1998 || Socorro || LINEAR || — || align=right | 1.7 km || 
|-id=445 bgcolor=#E9E9E9
| 134445 ||  || — || September 26, 1998 || Socorro || LINEAR || — || align=right | 1.8 km || 
|-id=446 bgcolor=#E9E9E9
| 134446 ||  || — || September 26, 1998 || Socorro || LINEAR || — || align=right | 2.0 km || 
|-id=447 bgcolor=#E9E9E9
| 134447 ||  || — || September 26, 1998 || Socorro || LINEAR || — || align=right | 1.7 km || 
|-id=448 bgcolor=#fefefe
| 134448 ||  || — || September 26, 1998 || Socorro || LINEAR || — || align=right | 1.8 km || 
|-id=449 bgcolor=#E9E9E9
| 134449 ||  || — || September 26, 1998 || Socorro || LINEAR || — || align=right | 1.5 km || 
|-id=450 bgcolor=#E9E9E9
| 134450 ||  || — || September 26, 1998 || Socorro || LINEAR || — || align=right | 1.3 km || 
|-id=451 bgcolor=#E9E9E9
| 134451 ||  || — || September 26, 1998 || Socorro || LINEAR || RAF || align=right | 1.9 km || 
|-id=452 bgcolor=#E9E9E9
| 134452 ||  || — || September 26, 1998 || Socorro || LINEAR || — || align=right | 2.3 km || 
|-id=453 bgcolor=#E9E9E9
| 134453 ||  || — || September 26, 1998 || Socorro || LINEAR || — || align=right | 2.2 km || 
|-id=454 bgcolor=#E9E9E9
| 134454 ||  || — || September 26, 1998 || Socorro || LINEAR || — || align=right | 1.6 km || 
|-id=455 bgcolor=#E9E9E9
| 134455 ||  || — || September 26, 1998 || Socorro || LINEAR || — || align=right | 1.9 km || 
|-id=456 bgcolor=#E9E9E9
| 134456 ||  || — || September 26, 1998 || Socorro || LINEAR || — || align=right | 2.5 km || 
|-id=457 bgcolor=#E9E9E9
| 134457 ||  || — || September 26, 1998 || Socorro || LINEAR || — || align=right | 1.8 km || 
|-id=458 bgcolor=#E9E9E9
| 134458 ||  || — || September 26, 1998 || Socorro || LINEAR || EUN || align=right | 2.0 km || 
|-id=459 bgcolor=#E9E9E9
| 134459 ||  || — || September 26, 1998 || Socorro || LINEAR || — || align=right | 1.6 km || 
|-id=460 bgcolor=#E9E9E9
| 134460 ||  || — || September 26, 1998 || Socorro || LINEAR || — || align=right | 2.0 km || 
|-id=461 bgcolor=#E9E9E9
| 134461 ||  || — || September 26, 1998 || Socorro || LINEAR || — || align=right | 1.7 km || 
|-id=462 bgcolor=#E9E9E9
| 134462 ||  || — || September 18, 1998 || La Silla || E. W. Elst || — || align=right | 1.7 km || 
|-id=463 bgcolor=#E9E9E9
| 134463 ||  || — || September 22, 1998 || Anderson Mesa || LONEOS || — || align=right | 1.7 km || 
|-id=464 bgcolor=#E9E9E9
| 134464 ||  || — || October 13, 1998 || Caussols || ODAS || — || align=right | 2.1 km || 
|-id=465 bgcolor=#E9E9E9
| 134465 ||  || — || October 13, 1998 || Kitt Peak || Spacewatch || — || align=right | 2.1 km || 
|-id=466 bgcolor=#E9E9E9
| 134466 ||  || — || October 14, 1998 || Xinglong || SCAP || — || align=right | 1.8 km || 
|-id=467 bgcolor=#E9E9E9
| 134467 ||  || — || October 22, 1998 || Višnjan Observatory || K. Korlević || — || align=right | 1.8 km || 
|-id=468 bgcolor=#d6d6d6
| 134468 ||  || — || October 17, 1998 || Xinglong || SCAP || 615 || align=right | 3.6 km || 
|-id=469 bgcolor=#E9E9E9
| 134469 ||  || — || October 17, 1998 || Kitt Peak || Spacewatch || — || align=right | 2.3 km || 
|-id=470 bgcolor=#E9E9E9
| 134470 ||  || — || October 28, 1998 || Socorro || LINEAR || — || align=right | 1.6 km || 
|-id=471 bgcolor=#E9E9E9
| 134471 ||  || — || October 28, 1998 || Socorro || LINEAR || — || align=right | 3.0 km || 
|-id=472 bgcolor=#E9E9E9
| 134472 ||  || — || October 28, 1998 || Socorro || LINEAR || — || align=right | 2.1 km || 
|-id=473 bgcolor=#d6d6d6
| 134473 ||  || — || November 10, 1998 || Socorro || LINEAR || — || align=right | 4.0 km || 
|-id=474 bgcolor=#E9E9E9
| 134474 ||  || — || November 10, 1998 || Socorro || LINEAR || — || align=right | 2.0 km || 
|-id=475 bgcolor=#E9E9E9
| 134475 ||  || — || November 10, 1998 || Socorro || LINEAR || — || align=right | 1.7 km || 
|-id=476 bgcolor=#E9E9E9
| 134476 ||  || — || November 11, 1998 || Socorro || LINEAR || — || align=right | 1.4 km || 
|-id=477 bgcolor=#E9E9E9
| 134477 ||  || — || November 11, 1998 || Socorro || LINEAR || — || align=right | 1.7 km || 
|-id=478 bgcolor=#E9E9E9
| 134478 ||  || — || November 13, 1998 || Socorro || LINEAR || MIT || align=right | 5.4 km || 
|-id=479 bgcolor=#E9E9E9
| 134479 ||  || — || November 13, 1998 || Socorro || LINEAR || — || align=right | 3.3 km || 
|-id=480 bgcolor=#E9E9E9
| 134480 ||  || — || November 14, 1998 || Socorro || LINEAR || — || align=right | 3.3 km || 
|-id=481 bgcolor=#E9E9E9
| 134481 ||  || — || November 14, 1998 || Socorro || LINEAR || — || align=right | 2.5 km || 
|-id=482 bgcolor=#fefefe
| 134482 ||  || — || November 17, 1998 || Socorro || LINEAR || H || align=right data-sort-value="0.95" | 950 m || 
|-id=483 bgcolor=#E9E9E9
| 134483 ||  || — || November 19, 1998 || Cocoa || I. P. Griffin || — || align=right | 1.7 km || 
|-id=484 bgcolor=#E9E9E9
| 134484 ||  || — || November 21, 1998 || Socorro || LINEAR || EUN || align=right | 2.7 km || 
|-id=485 bgcolor=#E9E9E9
| 134485 ||  || — || November 18, 1998 || Socorro || LINEAR || — || align=right | 1.8 km || 
|-id=486 bgcolor=#E9E9E9
| 134486 || 1998 XP || — || December 10, 1998 || Kleť || Kleť Obs. || — || align=right | 2.2 km || 
|-id=487 bgcolor=#E9E9E9
| 134487 ||  || — || December 8, 1998 || Kitt Peak || Spacewatch || HEN || align=right | 1.5 km || 
|-id=488 bgcolor=#E9E9E9
| 134488 ||  || — || December 11, 1998 || Kitt Peak || Spacewatch || — || align=right | 1.8 km || 
|-id=489 bgcolor=#E9E9E9
| 134489 ||  || — || December 14, 1998 || Socorro || LINEAR || — || align=right | 3.4 km || 
|-id=490 bgcolor=#E9E9E9
| 134490 ||  || — || December 14, 1998 || Socorro || LINEAR || — || align=right | 3.2 km || 
|-id=491 bgcolor=#E9E9E9
| 134491 ||  || — || December 14, 1998 || Socorro || LINEAR || — || align=right | 2.7 km || 
|-id=492 bgcolor=#E9E9E9
| 134492 ||  || — || December 14, 1998 || Socorro || LINEAR || GEF || align=right | 3.1 km || 
|-id=493 bgcolor=#E9E9E9
| 134493 ||  || — || December 14, 1998 || Socorro || LINEAR || ADE || align=right | 6.7 km || 
|-id=494 bgcolor=#E9E9E9
| 134494 ||  || — || December 14, 1998 || Socorro || LINEAR || — || align=right | 3.9 km || 
|-id=495 bgcolor=#E9E9E9
| 134495 ||  || — || December 26, 1998 || Kitt Peak || Spacewatch || — || align=right | 4.7 km || 
|-id=496 bgcolor=#E9E9E9
| 134496 ||  || — || January 11, 1999 || Kitt Peak || Spacewatch || GEF || align=right | 3.2 km || 
|-id=497 bgcolor=#E9E9E9
| 134497 ||  || — || January 16, 1999 || Višnjan Observatory || K. Korlević || — || align=right | 6.4 km || 
|-id=498 bgcolor=#E9E9E9
| 134498 ||  || — || January 21, 1999 || Višnjan Observatory || K. Korlević || DOR || align=right | 4.9 km || 
|-id=499 bgcolor=#E9E9E9
| 134499 ||  || — || January 22, 1999 || Višnjan Observatory || K. Korlević || GEF || align=right | 2.8 km || 
|-id=500 bgcolor=#E9E9E9
| 134500 ||  || — || January 16, 1999 || Kitt Peak || Spacewatch || — || align=right | 4.2 km || 
|}

134501–134600 

|-bgcolor=#E9E9E9
| 134501 ||  || — || February 10, 1999 || Socorro || LINEAR || — || align=right | 5.8 km || 
|-id=502 bgcolor=#E9E9E9
| 134502 ||  || — || February 12, 1999 || Socorro || LINEAR || — || align=right | 4.7 km || 
|-id=503 bgcolor=#E9E9E9
| 134503 ||  || — || February 10, 1999 || Socorro || LINEAR || — || align=right | 4.2 km || 
|-id=504 bgcolor=#d6d6d6
| 134504 ||  || — || February 10, 1999 || Socorro || LINEAR || EUP || align=right | 8.5 km || 
|-id=505 bgcolor=#E9E9E9
| 134505 ||  || — || February 10, 1999 || Socorro || LINEAR || — || align=right | 3.8 km || 
|-id=506 bgcolor=#E9E9E9
| 134506 ||  || — || February 12, 1999 || Socorro || LINEAR || — || align=right | 3.6 km || 
|-id=507 bgcolor=#E9E9E9
| 134507 ||  || — || February 10, 1999 || Kitt Peak || Spacewatch || — || align=right | 7.0 km || 
|-id=508 bgcolor=#E9E9E9
| 134508 ||  || — || February 9, 1999 || Kitt Peak || Spacewatch || GEF || align=right | 2.7 km || 
|-id=509 bgcolor=#FA8072
| 134509 ||  || — || March 20, 1999 || Socorro || LINEAR || — || align=right | 1.3 km || 
|-id=510 bgcolor=#d6d6d6
| 134510 ||  || — || March 24, 1999 || Monte Agliale || M. M. M. Santangelo || THM || align=right | 4.2 km || 
|-id=511 bgcolor=#E9E9E9
| 134511 ||  || — || March 20, 1999 || Socorro || LINEAR || JUN || align=right | 3.5 km || 
|-id=512 bgcolor=#fefefe
| 134512 ||  || — || April 7, 1999 || Socorro || LINEAR || — || align=right | 1.7 km || 
|-id=513 bgcolor=#d6d6d6
| 134513 ||  || — || May 10, 1999 || Socorro || LINEAR || THM || align=right | 5.9 km || 
|-id=514 bgcolor=#fefefe
| 134514 ||  || — || May 13, 1999 || Socorro || LINEAR || — || align=right | 3.1 km || 
|-id=515 bgcolor=#d6d6d6
| 134515 ||  || — || May 10, 1999 || Socorro || LINEAR || — || align=right | 4.6 km || 
|-id=516 bgcolor=#fefefe
| 134516 ||  || — || May 18, 1999 || Socorro || LINEAR || — || align=right | 1.3 km || 
|-id=517 bgcolor=#fefefe
| 134517 || 1999 NN || — || July 7, 1999 || Reedy Creek || J. Broughton || — || align=right | 1.4 km || 
|-id=518 bgcolor=#fefefe
| 134518 ||  || — || July 14, 1999 || Socorro || LINEAR || — || align=right | 1.5 km || 
|-id=519 bgcolor=#fefefe
| 134519 ||  || — || July 14, 1999 || Socorro || LINEAR || FLO || align=right | 1.3 km || 
|-id=520 bgcolor=#fefefe
| 134520 ||  || — || August 12, 1999 || Farpoint || G. Hug || — || align=right | 1.2 km || 
|-id=521 bgcolor=#fefefe
| 134521 ||  || — || September 4, 1999 || Kitt Peak || Spacewatch || — || align=right | 1.3 km || 
|-id=522 bgcolor=#fefefe
| 134522 ||  || — || September 7, 1999 || Socorro || LINEAR || V || align=right | 1.1 km || 
|-id=523 bgcolor=#fefefe
| 134523 ||  || — || September 7, 1999 || Socorro || LINEAR || — || align=right | 1.3 km || 
|-id=524 bgcolor=#fefefe
| 134524 ||  || — || September 7, 1999 || Socorro || LINEAR || — || align=right | 1.4 km || 
|-id=525 bgcolor=#fefefe
| 134525 ||  || — || September 7, 1999 || Socorro || LINEAR || NYS || align=right | 3.2 km || 
|-id=526 bgcolor=#fefefe
| 134526 ||  || — || September 7, 1999 || Socorro || LINEAR || — || align=right | 1.6 km || 
|-id=527 bgcolor=#fefefe
| 134527 ||  || — || September 8, 1999 || Socorro || LINEAR || PHO || align=right | 2.1 km || 
|-id=528 bgcolor=#fefefe
| 134528 ||  || — || September 12, 1999 || Ondřejov || P. Pravec, P. Kušnirák || — || align=right | 1.7 km || 
|-id=529 bgcolor=#fefefe
| 134529 ||  || — || September 12, 1999 || Catalina || CSS || — || align=right | 3.7 km || 
|-id=530 bgcolor=#fefefe
| 134530 ||  || — || September 7, 1999 || Socorro || LINEAR || — || align=right | 1.8 km || 
|-id=531 bgcolor=#fefefe
| 134531 ||  || — || September 7, 1999 || Socorro || LINEAR || FLO || align=right | 1.4 km || 
|-id=532 bgcolor=#fefefe
| 134532 ||  || — || September 7, 1999 || Socorro || LINEAR || — || align=right | 1.2 km || 
|-id=533 bgcolor=#fefefe
| 134533 ||  || — || September 7, 1999 || Socorro || LINEAR || — || align=right | 2.2 km || 
|-id=534 bgcolor=#fefefe
| 134534 ||  || — || September 7, 1999 || Socorro || LINEAR || — || align=right | 1.4 km || 
|-id=535 bgcolor=#fefefe
| 134535 ||  || — || September 7, 1999 || Socorro || LINEAR || FLO || align=right | 1.1 km || 
|-id=536 bgcolor=#fefefe
| 134536 ||  || — || September 7, 1999 || Socorro || LINEAR || V || align=right | 1.2 km || 
|-id=537 bgcolor=#fefefe
| 134537 ||  || — || September 7, 1999 || Socorro || LINEAR || V || align=right | 1.0 km || 
|-id=538 bgcolor=#fefefe
| 134538 ||  || — || September 7, 1999 || Socorro || LINEAR || — || align=right | 1.3 km || 
|-id=539 bgcolor=#fefefe
| 134539 ||  || — || September 7, 1999 || Socorro || LINEAR || V || align=right | 1.2 km || 
|-id=540 bgcolor=#fefefe
| 134540 ||  || — || September 7, 1999 || Socorro || LINEAR || — || align=right | 1.3 km || 
|-id=541 bgcolor=#fefefe
| 134541 ||  || — || September 7, 1999 || Socorro || LINEAR || — || align=right | 1.9 km || 
|-id=542 bgcolor=#fefefe
| 134542 ||  || — || September 8, 1999 || Socorro || LINEAR || V || align=right | 1.3 km || 
|-id=543 bgcolor=#fefefe
| 134543 ||  || — || September 9, 1999 || Socorro || LINEAR || — || align=right | 1.5 km || 
|-id=544 bgcolor=#fefefe
| 134544 ||  || — || September 9, 1999 || Socorro || LINEAR || V || align=right | 1.2 km || 
|-id=545 bgcolor=#fefefe
| 134545 ||  || — || September 9, 1999 || Socorro || LINEAR || V || align=right | 1.2 km || 
|-id=546 bgcolor=#fefefe
| 134546 ||  || — || September 9, 1999 || Socorro || LINEAR || — || align=right | 1.6 km || 
|-id=547 bgcolor=#fefefe
| 134547 ||  || — || September 9, 1999 || Socorro || LINEAR || NYS || align=right | 1.3 km || 
|-id=548 bgcolor=#fefefe
| 134548 ||  || — || September 9, 1999 || Socorro || LINEAR || — || align=right | 1.4 km || 
|-id=549 bgcolor=#fefefe
| 134549 ||  || — || September 9, 1999 || Socorro || LINEAR || Vslow? || align=right | 1.6 km || 
|-id=550 bgcolor=#fefefe
| 134550 ||  || — || September 9, 1999 || Socorro || LINEAR || — || align=right | 1.5 km || 
|-id=551 bgcolor=#fefefe
| 134551 ||  || — || September 9, 1999 || Socorro || LINEAR || FLO || align=right | 1.5 km || 
|-id=552 bgcolor=#fefefe
| 134552 ||  || — || September 9, 1999 || Socorro || LINEAR || — || align=right | 1.8 km || 
|-id=553 bgcolor=#fefefe
| 134553 ||  || — || September 9, 1999 || Socorro || LINEAR || slow || align=right | 1.3 km || 
|-id=554 bgcolor=#fefefe
| 134554 ||  || — || September 9, 1999 || Socorro || LINEAR || FLO || align=right | 1.3 km || 
|-id=555 bgcolor=#fefefe
| 134555 ||  || — || September 9, 1999 || Socorro || LINEAR || ERIslow || align=right | 3.9 km || 
|-id=556 bgcolor=#fefefe
| 134556 ||  || — || September 9, 1999 || Socorro || LINEAR || — || align=right | 1.5 km || 
|-id=557 bgcolor=#fefefe
| 134557 ||  || — || September 9, 1999 || Socorro || LINEAR || — || align=right | 2.0 km || 
|-id=558 bgcolor=#fefefe
| 134558 ||  || — || September 9, 1999 || Socorro || LINEAR || — || align=right | 1.2 km || 
|-id=559 bgcolor=#fefefe
| 134559 ||  || — || September 9, 1999 || Socorro || LINEAR || — || align=right | 1.4 km || 
|-id=560 bgcolor=#fefefe
| 134560 ||  || — || September 9, 1999 || Socorro || LINEAR || V || align=right | 1.4 km || 
|-id=561 bgcolor=#fefefe
| 134561 ||  || — || September 9, 1999 || Socorro || LINEAR || NYS || align=right | 1.9 km || 
|-id=562 bgcolor=#d6d6d6
| 134562 ||  || — || September 9, 1999 || Socorro || LINEAR || SHU3:2 || align=right | 9.8 km || 
|-id=563 bgcolor=#fefefe
| 134563 ||  || — || September 9, 1999 || Socorro || LINEAR || V || align=right | 1.2 km || 
|-id=564 bgcolor=#fefefe
| 134564 ||  || — || September 9, 1999 || Socorro || LINEAR || NYS || align=right | 1.1 km || 
|-id=565 bgcolor=#fefefe
| 134565 ||  || — || September 8, 1999 || Socorro || LINEAR || — || align=right | 1.9 km || 
|-id=566 bgcolor=#fefefe
| 134566 ||  || — || September 8, 1999 || Socorro || LINEAR || V || align=right | 1.4 km || 
|-id=567 bgcolor=#fefefe
| 134567 ||  || — || September 9, 1999 || Socorro || LINEAR || — || align=right | 1.6 km || 
|-id=568 bgcolor=#C2E0FF
| 134568 ||  || — || September 7, 1999 || Mauna Kea || C. Trujillo, D. C. Jewitt, J. X. Luu || cubewano? || align=right | 106 km || 
|-id=569 bgcolor=#fefefe
| 134569 ||  || — || September 7, 1999 || Anderson Mesa || LONEOS || FLO || align=right | 1.3 km || 
|-id=570 bgcolor=#fefefe
| 134570 ||  || — || September 14, 1999 || Catalina || CSS || NYS || align=right | 1.00 km || 
|-id=571 bgcolor=#fefefe
| 134571 ||  || — || September 7, 1999 || Socorro || LINEAR || — || align=right | 1.6 km || 
|-id=572 bgcolor=#fefefe
| 134572 ||  || — || September 7, 1999 || Kitt Peak || Spacewatch || NYS || align=right | 1.1 km || 
|-id=573 bgcolor=#fefefe
| 134573 ||  || — || September 22, 1999 || Socorro || LINEAR || PHO || align=right | 2.5 km || 
|-id=574 bgcolor=#fefefe
| 134574 ||  || — || September 29, 1999 || Catalina || CSS || — || align=right | 1.8 km || 
|-id=575 bgcolor=#fefefe
| 134575 ||  || — || September 30, 1999 || Catalina || CSS || — || align=right | 1.5 km || 
|-id=576 bgcolor=#fefefe
| 134576 ||  || — || September 30, 1999 || Catalina || CSS || PHO || align=right | 2.6 km || 
|-id=577 bgcolor=#fefefe
| 134577 ||  || — || September 27, 1999 || Socorro || LINEAR || — || align=right | 6.6 km || 
|-id=578 bgcolor=#fefefe
| 134578 ||  || — || October 7, 1999 || Višnjan Observatory || K. Korlević, M. Jurić || — || align=right | 2.6 km || 
|-id=579 bgcolor=#fefefe
| 134579 ||  || — || October 13, 1999 || Prescott || P. G. Comba || NYS || align=right data-sort-value="0.98" | 980 m || 
|-id=580 bgcolor=#fefefe
| 134580 ||  || — || October 11, 1999 || Uccle || T. Pauwels || V || align=right | 1.4 km || 
|-id=581 bgcolor=#fefefe
| 134581 ||  || — || October 4, 1999 || Socorro || LINEAR || V || align=right | 1.4 km || 
|-id=582 bgcolor=#fefefe
| 134582 ||  || — || October 4, 1999 || Socorro || LINEAR || — || align=right | 1.3 km || 
|-id=583 bgcolor=#fefefe
| 134583 ||  || — || October 4, 1999 || Socorro || LINEAR || MAS || align=right | 1.2 km || 
|-id=584 bgcolor=#fefefe
| 134584 ||  || — || October 3, 1999 || Kitt Peak || Spacewatch || — || align=right | 2.8 km || 
|-id=585 bgcolor=#fefefe
| 134585 ||  || — || October 6, 1999 || Kitt Peak || Spacewatch || MAS || align=right | 1.1 km || 
|-id=586 bgcolor=#fefefe
| 134586 ||  || — || October 7, 1999 || Kitt Peak || Spacewatch || NYS || align=right data-sort-value="0.93" | 930 m || 
|-id=587 bgcolor=#E9E9E9
| 134587 ||  || — || October 7, 1999 || Kitt Peak || Spacewatch || — || align=right | 2.9 km || 
|-id=588 bgcolor=#fefefe
| 134588 ||  || — || October 8, 1999 || Kitt Peak || Spacewatch || — || align=right data-sort-value="0.98" | 980 m || 
|-id=589 bgcolor=#fefefe
| 134589 ||  || — || October 2, 1999 || Socorro || LINEAR || NYS || align=right data-sort-value="0.99" | 990 m || 
|-id=590 bgcolor=#fefefe
| 134590 ||  || — || October 2, 1999 || Socorro || LINEAR || V || align=right | 1.3 km || 
|-id=591 bgcolor=#fefefe
| 134591 ||  || — || October 3, 1999 || Socorro || LINEAR || — || align=right | 2.0 km || 
|-id=592 bgcolor=#fefefe
| 134592 ||  || — || October 4, 1999 || Socorro || LINEAR || V || align=right | 1.3 km || 
|-id=593 bgcolor=#fefefe
| 134593 ||  || — || October 4, 1999 || Socorro || LINEAR || — || align=right | 1.9 km || 
|-id=594 bgcolor=#fefefe
| 134594 ||  || — || October 4, 1999 || Socorro || LINEAR || NYS || align=right | 1.2 km || 
|-id=595 bgcolor=#fefefe
| 134595 ||  || — || October 4, 1999 || Socorro || LINEAR || NYS || align=right | 1.1 km || 
|-id=596 bgcolor=#fefefe
| 134596 ||  || — || October 4, 1999 || Socorro || LINEAR || V || align=right | 1.1 km || 
|-id=597 bgcolor=#fefefe
| 134597 ||  || — || October 4, 1999 || Socorro || LINEAR || — || align=right | 1.4 km || 
|-id=598 bgcolor=#E9E9E9
| 134598 ||  || — || October 7, 1999 || Socorro || LINEAR || AGN || align=right | 2.3 km || 
|-id=599 bgcolor=#fefefe
| 134599 ||  || — || October 7, 1999 || Socorro || LINEAR || — || align=right | 1.8 km || 
|-id=600 bgcolor=#fefefe
| 134600 ||  || — || October 7, 1999 || Socorro || LINEAR || V || align=right | 1.1 km || 
|}

134601–134700 

|-bgcolor=#fefefe
| 134601 ||  || — || October 7, 1999 || Socorro || LINEAR || — || align=right | 1.8 km || 
|-id=602 bgcolor=#fefefe
| 134602 ||  || — || October 7, 1999 || Socorro || LINEAR || V || align=right | 1.4 km || 
|-id=603 bgcolor=#fefefe
| 134603 ||  || — || October 10, 1999 || Socorro || LINEAR || MAS || align=right | 1.2 km || 
|-id=604 bgcolor=#fefefe
| 134604 ||  || — || October 10, 1999 || Socorro || LINEAR || — || align=right | 1.7 km || 
|-id=605 bgcolor=#fefefe
| 134605 ||  || — || October 10, 1999 || Socorro || LINEAR || — || align=right | 1.3 km || 
|-id=606 bgcolor=#d6d6d6
| 134606 ||  || — || October 12, 1999 || Socorro || LINEAR || HIL3:2 || align=right | 13 km || 
|-id=607 bgcolor=#fefefe
| 134607 ||  || — || October 12, 1999 || Socorro || LINEAR || — || align=right | 1.4 km || 
|-id=608 bgcolor=#fefefe
| 134608 ||  || — || October 13, 1999 || Socorro || LINEAR || — || align=right | 1.9 km || 
|-id=609 bgcolor=#fefefe
| 134609 ||  || — || October 15, 1999 || Socorro || LINEAR || — || align=right | 1.5 km || 
|-id=610 bgcolor=#fefefe
| 134610 ||  || — || October 15, 1999 || Socorro || LINEAR || FLO || align=right | 1.1 km || 
|-id=611 bgcolor=#fefefe
| 134611 ||  || — || October 15, 1999 || Socorro || LINEAR || — || align=right | 1.6 km || 
|-id=612 bgcolor=#E9E9E9
| 134612 ||  || — || October 15, 1999 || Socorro || LINEAR || — || align=right | 3.0 km || 
|-id=613 bgcolor=#fefefe
| 134613 ||  || — || October 1, 1999 || Catalina || CSS || — || align=right | 1.7 km || 
|-id=614 bgcolor=#fefefe
| 134614 ||  || — || October 5, 1999 || Catalina || CSS || ERI || align=right | 3.0 km || 
|-id=615 bgcolor=#fefefe
| 134615 ||  || — || October 5, 1999 || Catalina || CSS || V || align=right | 1.1 km || 
|-id=616 bgcolor=#fefefe
| 134616 ||  || — || October 3, 1999 || Catalina || CSS || NYS || align=right | 1.1 km || 
|-id=617 bgcolor=#fefefe
| 134617 ||  || — || October 4, 1999 || Anderson Mesa || LONEOS || — || align=right | 1.8 km || 
|-id=618 bgcolor=#fefefe
| 134618 ||  || — || October 9, 1999 || Socorro || LINEAR || NYS || align=right | 1.0 km || 
|-id=619 bgcolor=#fefefe
| 134619 ||  || — || October 9, 1999 || Socorro || LINEAR || — || align=right | 1.4 km || 
|-id=620 bgcolor=#fefefe
| 134620 ||  || — || October 3, 1999 || Socorro || LINEAR || H || align=right | 1.1 km || 
|-id=621 bgcolor=#fefefe
| 134621 ||  || — || October 3, 1999 || Socorro || LINEAR || ERI || align=right | 2.8 km || 
|-id=622 bgcolor=#fefefe
| 134622 ||  || — || October 3, 1999 || Socorro || LINEAR || V || align=right | 1.2 km || 
|-id=623 bgcolor=#fefefe
| 134623 ||  || — || October 3, 1999 || Socorro || LINEAR || V || align=right | 1.3 km || 
|-id=624 bgcolor=#fefefe
| 134624 ||  || — || October 3, 1999 || Socorro || LINEAR || V || align=right | 1.5 km || 
|-id=625 bgcolor=#E9E9E9
| 134625 ||  || — || October 5, 1999 || Socorro || LINEAR || — || align=right | 5.0 km || 
|-id=626 bgcolor=#fefefe
| 134626 ||  || — || October 6, 1999 || Socorro || LINEAR || V || align=right | 1.3 km || 
|-id=627 bgcolor=#fefefe
| 134627 ||  || — || October 8, 1999 || Socorro || LINEAR || PHO || align=right | 1.1 km || 
|-id=628 bgcolor=#fefefe
| 134628 ||  || — || October 9, 1999 || Socorro || LINEAR || NYS || align=right | 1.2 km || 
|-id=629 bgcolor=#fefefe
| 134629 ||  || — || October 10, 1999 || Socorro || LINEAR || — || align=right | 1.8 km || 
|-id=630 bgcolor=#fefefe
| 134630 ||  || — || October 9, 1999 || Catalina || CSS || — || align=right | 1.3 km || 
|-id=631 bgcolor=#fefefe
| 134631 ||  || — || October 2, 1999 || Anderson Mesa || LONEOS || — || align=right | 1.6 km || 
|-id=632 bgcolor=#fefefe
| 134632 ||  || — || October 30, 1999 || Socorro || LINEAR || — || align=right | 3.3 km || 
|-id=633 bgcolor=#fefefe
| 134633 ||  || — || October 29, 1999 || Catalina || CSS || NYS || align=right | 1.4 km || 
|-id=634 bgcolor=#fefefe
| 134634 ||  || — || October 31, 1999 || Kitt Peak || Spacewatch || MAS || align=right | 1.2 km || 
|-id=635 bgcolor=#fefefe
| 134635 ||  || — || October 29, 1999 || Catalina || CSS || KLI || align=right | 3.6 km || 
|-id=636 bgcolor=#fefefe
| 134636 ||  || — || October 31, 1999 || Kitt Peak || Spacewatch || PHO || align=right | 1.7 km || 
|-id=637 bgcolor=#fefefe
| 134637 ||  || — || October 28, 1999 || Catalina || CSS || V || align=right | 1.4 km || 
|-id=638 bgcolor=#E9E9E9
| 134638 ||  || — || October 16, 1999 || Kitt Peak || Spacewatch || MRX || align=right | 2.1 km || 
|-id=639 bgcolor=#fefefe
| 134639 ||  || — || October 17, 1999 || Anderson Mesa || LONEOS || V || align=right | 1.5 km || 
|-id=640 bgcolor=#fefefe
| 134640 ||  || — || October 28, 1999 || Catalina || CSS || V || align=right | 1.3 km || 
|-id=641 bgcolor=#fefefe
| 134641 ||  || — || October 28, 1999 || Catalina || CSS || — || align=right | 1.9 km || 
|-id=642 bgcolor=#d6d6d6
| 134642 ||  || — || October 30, 1999 || Catalina || CSS || SHU3:2 || align=right | 11 km || 
|-id=643 bgcolor=#fefefe
| 134643 ||  || — || October 30, 1999 || Catalina || CSS || — || align=right | 2.2 km || 
|-id=644 bgcolor=#fefefe
| 134644 ||  || — || November 5, 1999 || Višnjan Observatory || K. Korlević || NYS || align=right | 4.7 km || 
|-id=645 bgcolor=#fefefe
| 134645 ||  || — || November 5, 1999 || Višnjan Observatory || K. Korlević || NYS || align=right | 4.0 km || 
|-id=646 bgcolor=#fefefe
| 134646 ||  || — || November 7, 1999 || Višnjan Observatory || K. Korlević || NYS || align=right | 4.1 km || 
|-id=647 bgcolor=#fefefe
| 134647 ||  || — || November 8, 1999 || Višnjan Observatory || K. Korlević || — || align=right | 1.5 km || 
|-id=648 bgcolor=#fefefe
| 134648 ||  || — || November 13, 1999 || Fountain Hills || C. W. Juels || — || align=right | 2.2 km || 
|-id=649 bgcolor=#fefefe
| 134649 ||  || — || November 3, 1999 || Socorro || LINEAR || — || align=right | 1.1 km || 
|-id=650 bgcolor=#fefefe
| 134650 ||  || — || November 3, 1999 || Socorro || LINEAR || NYS || align=right | 1.4 km || 
|-id=651 bgcolor=#fefefe
| 134651 ||  || — || November 3, 1999 || Socorro || LINEAR || — || align=right | 2.4 km || 
|-id=652 bgcolor=#d6d6d6
| 134652 ||  || — || November 3, 1999 || Socorro || LINEAR || 3:2 || align=right | 9.5 km || 
|-id=653 bgcolor=#fefefe
| 134653 ||  || — || November 10, 1999 || Socorro || LINEAR || — || align=right | 1.5 km || 
|-id=654 bgcolor=#fefefe
| 134654 ||  || — || November 13, 1999 || Uenohara || N. Kawasato || — || align=right | 1.9 km || 
|-id=655 bgcolor=#fefefe
| 134655 ||  || — || November 3, 1999 || Socorro || LINEAR || — || align=right | 1.5 km || 
|-id=656 bgcolor=#fefefe
| 134656 ||  || — || November 4, 1999 || Socorro || LINEAR || V || align=right | 1.5 km || 
|-id=657 bgcolor=#fefefe
| 134657 ||  || — || November 4, 1999 || Socorro || LINEAR || NYS || align=right | 1.2 km || 
|-id=658 bgcolor=#fefefe
| 134658 ||  || — || November 4, 1999 || Socorro || LINEAR || NYS || align=right | 1.3 km || 
|-id=659 bgcolor=#fefefe
| 134659 ||  || — || November 4, 1999 || Socorro || LINEAR || — || align=right | 1.6 km || 
|-id=660 bgcolor=#fefefe
| 134660 ||  || — || November 9, 1999 || Socorro || LINEAR || MAS || align=right | 1.3 km || 
|-id=661 bgcolor=#fefefe
| 134661 ||  || — || November 9, 1999 || Socorro || LINEAR || MAS || align=right | 1.1 km || 
|-id=662 bgcolor=#fefefe
| 134662 ||  || — || November 9, 1999 || Kitt Peak || Spacewatch || MAS || align=right | 1.1 km || 
|-id=663 bgcolor=#fefefe
| 134663 ||  || — || November 13, 1999 || Anderson Mesa || LONEOS || — || align=right | 2.0 km || 
|-id=664 bgcolor=#fefefe
| 134664 ||  || — || November 11, 1999 || Catalina || CSS || — || align=right | 1.4 km || 
|-id=665 bgcolor=#fefefe
| 134665 ||  || — || November 14, 1999 || Socorro || LINEAR || FLO || align=right | 2.9 km || 
|-id=666 bgcolor=#fefefe
| 134666 ||  || — || November 12, 1999 || Socorro || LINEAR || NYS || align=right | 1.3 km || 
|-id=667 bgcolor=#fefefe
| 134667 ||  || — || November 14, 1999 || Socorro || LINEAR || — || align=right | 3.0 km || 
|-id=668 bgcolor=#fefefe
| 134668 ||  || — || November 14, 1999 || Socorro || LINEAR || NYS || align=right | 1.3 km || 
|-id=669 bgcolor=#fefefe
| 134669 ||  || — || November 15, 1999 || Socorro || LINEAR || MAS || align=right | 1.4 km || 
|-id=670 bgcolor=#fefefe
| 134670 ||  || — || November 15, 1999 || Socorro || LINEAR || NYS || align=right | 1.00 km || 
|-id=671 bgcolor=#fefefe
| 134671 ||  || — || November 1, 1999 || Catalina || CSS || V || align=right | 1.3 km || 
|-id=672 bgcolor=#fefefe
| 134672 ||  || — || November 11, 1999 || Catalina || CSS || ERI || align=right | 3.9 km || 
|-id=673 bgcolor=#fefefe
| 134673 ||  || — || November 14, 1999 || Uccle || E. W. Elst || NYS || align=right | 1.2 km || 
|-id=674 bgcolor=#fefefe
| 134674 ||  || — || November 5, 1999 || Socorro || LINEAR || — || align=right | 1.5 km || 
|-id=675 bgcolor=#fefefe
| 134675 ||  || — || November 28, 1999 || Višnjan Observatory || K. Korlević || V || align=right | 1.4 km || 
|-id=676 bgcolor=#fefefe
| 134676 ||  || — || November 29, 1999 || Nachi-Katsuura || H. Shiozawa, T. Urata || — || align=right | 2.1 km || 
|-id=677 bgcolor=#fefefe
| 134677 ||  || — || November 28, 1999 || Kitt Peak || Spacewatch || V || align=right | 1.7 km || 
|-id=678 bgcolor=#fefefe
| 134678 ||  || — || November 30, 1999 || Kitt Peak || Spacewatch || — || align=right | 1.4 km || 
|-id=679 bgcolor=#fefefe
| 134679 ||  || — || December 4, 1999 || Catalina || CSS || NYS || align=right | 1.5 km || 
|-id=680 bgcolor=#fefefe
| 134680 ||  || — || December 6, 1999 || Socorro || LINEAR || V || align=right | 1.6 km || 
|-id=681 bgcolor=#FA8072
| 134681 ||  || — || December 6, 1999 || Socorro || LINEAR || — || align=right | 2.1 km || 
|-id=682 bgcolor=#fefefe
| 134682 ||  || — || December 6, 1999 || Socorro || LINEAR || — || align=right | 1.9 km || 
|-id=683 bgcolor=#fefefe
| 134683 ||  || — || December 6, 1999 || Socorro || LINEAR || NYS || align=right | 1.2 km || 
|-id=684 bgcolor=#E9E9E9
| 134684 ||  || — || December 6, 1999 || Socorro || LINEAR || — || align=right | 2.3 km || 
|-id=685 bgcolor=#fefefe
| 134685 ||  || — || December 7, 1999 || Socorro || LINEAR || — || align=right | 1.4 km || 
|-id=686 bgcolor=#fefefe
| 134686 ||  || — || December 7, 1999 || Socorro || LINEAR || ERI || align=right | 3.4 km || 
|-id=687 bgcolor=#fefefe
| 134687 ||  || — || December 7, 1999 || Socorro || LINEAR || MAS || align=right | 3.6 km || 
|-id=688 bgcolor=#fefefe
| 134688 ||  || — || December 7, 1999 || Socorro || LINEAR || NYS || align=right | 1.2 km || 
|-id=689 bgcolor=#fefefe
| 134689 ||  || — || December 7, 1999 || Socorro || LINEAR || NYS || align=right | 1.6 km || 
|-id=690 bgcolor=#d6d6d6
| 134690 ||  || — || December 7, 1999 || Socorro || LINEAR || 3:2 || align=right | 9.9 km || 
|-id=691 bgcolor=#fefefe
| 134691 ||  || — || December 7, 1999 || Socorro || LINEAR || NYS || align=right | 1.5 km || 
|-id=692 bgcolor=#fefefe
| 134692 ||  || — || December 7, 1999 || Socorro || LINEAR || — || align=right | 1.6 km || 
|-id=693 bgcolor=#fefefe
| 134693 ||  || — || December 7, 1999 || Socorro || LINEAR || NYS || align=right | 1.6 km || 
|-id=694 bgcolor=#fefefe
| 134694 ||  || — || December 7, 1999 || Socorro || LINEAR || — || align=right | 1.0 km || 
|-id=695 bgcolor=#fefefe
| 134695 ||  || — || December 7, 1999 || Socorro || LINEAR || ERI || align=right | 4.0 km || 
|-id=696 bgcolor=#fefefe
| 134696 ||  || — || December 7, 1999 || Socorro || LINEAR || slow || align=right | 1.6 km || 
|-id=697 bgcolor=#fefefe
| 134697 ||  || — || December 8, 1999 || Ondřejov || P. Kušnirák, P. Pravec || — || align=right | 1.4 km || 
|-id=698 bgcolor=#fefefe
| 134698 ||  || — || December 5, 1999 || Catalina || CSS || — || align=right | 3.6 km || 
|-id=699 bgcolor=#fefefe
| 134699 ||  || — || December 5, 1999 || Catalina || CSS || NYS || align=right | 1.9 km || 
|-id=700 bgcolor=#fefefe
| 134700 ||  || — || December 5, 1999 || Catalina || CSS || — || align=right | 1.7 km || 
|}

134701–134800 

|-bgcolor=#fefefe
| 134701 ||  || — || December 7, 1999 || Catalina || CSS || ERI || align=right | 1.3 km || 
|-id=702 bgcolor=#fefefe
| 134702 ||  || — || December 7, 1999 || Catalina || CSS || V || align=right | 1.5 km || 
|-id=703 bgcolor=#fefefe
| 134703 ||  || — || December 2, 1999 || Anderson Mesa || LONEOS || NYS || align=right | 1.4 km || 
|-id=704 bgcolor=#fefefe
| 134704 ||  || — || December 8, 1999 || Socorro || LINEAR || NYS || align=right | 1.1 km || 
|-id=705 bgcolor=#FA8072
| 134705 ||  || — || December 12, 1999 || Socorro || LINEAR || — || align=right | 2.4 km || 
|-id=706 bgcolor=#E9E9E9
| 134706 ||  || — || December 12, 1999 || Socorro || LINEAR || EUN || align=right | 2.6 km || 
|-id=707 bgcolor=#fefefe
| 134707 ||  || — || December 13, 1999 || Socorro || LINEAR || — || align=right | 2.3 km || 
|-id=708 bgcolor=#E9E9E9
| 134708 ||  || — || December 14, 1999 || Socorro || LINEAR || RAF || align=right | 2.4 km || 
|-id=709 bgcolor=#E9E9E9
| 134709 ||  || — || December 14, 1999 || Kitt Peak || Spacewatch || — || align=right | 1.7 km || 
|-id=710 bgcolor=#fefefe
| 134710 ||  || — || December 7, 1999 || Anderson Mesa || LONEOS || — || align=right | 2.1 km || 
|-id=711 bgcolor=#fefefe
| 134711 ||  || — || December 13, 1999 || Anderson Mesa || LONEOS || — || align=right | 1.7 km || 
|-id=712 bgcolor=#fefefe
| 134712 ||  || — || December 6, 1999 || Socorro || LINEAR || — || align=right | 2.3 km || 
|-id=713 bgcolor=#fefefe
| 134713 ||  || — || December 5, 1999 || Kitt Peak || Spacewatch || NYS || align=right | 1.3 km || 
|-id=714 bgcolor=#E9E9E9
| 134714 ||  || — || December 12, 1999 || Kitt Peak || Spacewatch || — || align=right | 1.5 km || 
|-id=715 bgcolor=#E9E9E9
| 134715 ||  || — || December 31, 1999 || Kitt Peak || Spacewatch || — || align=right | 1.6 km || 
|-id=716 bgcolor=#E9E9E9
| 134716 ||  || — || December 31, 1999 || Kitt Peak || Spacewatch || — || align=right | 2.5 km || 
|-id=717 bgcolor=#E9E9E9
| 134717 ||  || — || January 2, 2000 || Socorro || LINEAR || — || align=right | 7.9 km || 
|-id=718 bgcolor=#E9E9E9
| 134718 ||  || — || January 3, 2000 || Socorro || LINEAR || — || align=right | 2.9 km || 
|-id=719 bgcolor=#fefefe
| 134719 ||  || — || January 3, 2000 || Socorro || LINEAR || V || align=right | 1.8 km || 
|-id=720 bgcolor=#C2FFFF
| 134720 ||  || — || January 3, 2000 || Socorro || LINEAR || L4 || align=right | 28 km || 
|-id=721 bgcolor=#fefefe
| 134721 ||  || — || January 3, 2000 || Socorro || LINEAR || — || align=right | 3.1 km || 
|-id=722 bgcolor=#E9E9E9
| 134722 ||  || — || January 3, 2000 || Socorro || LINEAR || — || align=right | 1.7 km || 
|-id=723 bgcolor=#E9E9E9
| 134723 ||  || — || January 3, 2000 || Socorro || LINEAR || — || align=right | 2.2 km || 
|-id=724 bgcolor=#fefefe
| 134724 ||  || — || January 3, 2000 || Socorro || LINEAR || — || align=right | 2.3 km || 
|-id=725 bgcolor=#fefefe
| 134725 ||  || — || January 4, 2000 || Socorro || LINEAR || ERI || align=right | 4.3 km || 
|-id=726 bgcolor=#E9E9E9
| 134726 ||  || — || January 4, 2000 || Socorro || LINEAR || — || align=right | 2.3 km || 
|-id=727 bgcolor=#fefefe
| 134727 ||  || — || January 5, 2000 || Socorro || LINEAR || V || align=right | 1.6 km || 
|-id=728 bgcolor=#fefefe
| 134728 ||  || — || January 5, 2000 || Socorro || LINEAR || — || align=right | 1.6 km || 
|-id=729 bgcolor=#fefefe
| 134729 ||  || — || January 2, 2000 || Socorro || LINEAR || PHO || align=right | 2.8 km || 
|-id=730 bgcolor=#fefefe
| 134730 ||  || — || January 4, 2000 || Socorro || LINEAR || H || align=right | 1.9 km || 
|-id=731 bgcolor=#fefefe
| 134731 ||  || — || January 5, 2000 || Socorro || LINEAR || — || align=right | 2.5 km || 
|-id=732 bgcolor=#fefefe
| 134732 ||  || — || January 5, 2000 || Socorro || LINEAR || — || align=right | 1.4 km || 
|-id=733 bgcolor=#E9E9E9
| 134733 ||  || — || January 5, 2000 || Socorro || LINEAR || BRU || align=right | 5.7 km || 
|-id=734 bgcolor=#E9E9E9
| 134734 ||  || — || January 5, 2000 || Socorro || LINEAR || — || align=right | 3.0 km || 
|-id=735 bgcolor=#E9E9E9
| 134735 ||  || — || January 5, 2000 || Socorro || LINEAR || EUN || align=right | 3.8 km || 
|-id=736 bgcolor=#fefefe
| 134736 ||  || — || January 8, 2000 || Socorro || LINEAR || — || align=right | 2.1 km || 
|-id=737 bgcolor=#fefefe
| 134737 ||  || — || January 3, 2000 || Socorro || LINEAR || — || align=right | 1.8 km || 
|-id=738 bgcolor=#E9E9E9
| 134738 ||  || — || January 13, 2000 || Kleť || Kleť Obs. || — || align=right | 3.3 km || 
|-id=739 bgcolor=#fefefe
| 134739 ||  || — || January 7, 2000 || Socorro || LINEAR || — || align=right | 2.0 km || 
|-id=740 bgcolor=#fefefe
| 134740 ||  || — || January 8, 2000 || Socorro || LINEAR || CHL || align=right | 6.1 km || 
|-id=741 bgcolor=#E9E9E9
| 134741 ||  || — || January 8, 2000 || Socorro || LINEAR || MIT || align=right | 4.3 km || 
|-id=742 bgcolor=#E9E9E9
| 134742 ||  || — || January 14, 2000 || Kleť || Kleť Obs. || — || align=right | 2.0 km || 
|-id=743 bgcolor=#fefefe
| 134743 ||  || — || January 4, 2000 || Anderson Mesa || LONEOS || — || align=right | 1.6 km || 
|-id=744 bgcolor=#E9E9E9
| 134744 ||  || — || January 4, 2000 || Socorro || LINEAR || — || align=right | 3.7 km || 
|-id=745 bgcolor=#fefefe
| 134745 ||  || — || January 2, 2000 || Socorro || LINEAR || — || align=right | 3.7 km || 
|-id=746 bgcolor=#FA8072
| 134746 ||  || — || January 29, 2000 || Socorro || LINEAR || H || align=right | 1.3 km || 
|-id=747 bgcolor=#E9E9E9
| 134747 ||  || — || January 28, 2000 || Kitt Peak || Spacewatch || — || align=right | 1.9 km || 
|-id=748 bgcolor=#E9E9E9
| 134748 ||  || — || January 28, 2000 || Uenohara || N. Kawasato || — || align=right | 1.7 km || 
|-id=749 bgcolor=#C2FFFF
| 134749 ||  || — || January 29, 2000 || Socorro || LINEAR || L4 || align=right | 26 km || 
|-id=750 bgcolor=#E9E9E9
| 134750 ||  || — || January 30, 2000 || Socorro || LINEAR || — || align=right | 1.8 km || 
|-id=751 bgcolor=#E9E9E9
| 134751 ||  || — || January 30, 2000 || Catalina || CSS || HNS || align=right | 2.3 km || 
|-id=752 bgcolor=#E9E9E9
| 134752 ||  || — || January 30, 2000 || Kitt Peak || Spacewatch || HNA || align=right | 4.7 km || 
|-id=753 bgcolor=#E9E9E9
| 134753 ||  || — || February 3, 2000 || Farpoint || Farpoint Obs. || — || align=right | 2.6 km || 
|-id=754 bgcolor=#E9E9E9
| 134754 ||  || — || February 2, 2000 || Socorro || LINEAR || MRX || align=right | 2.5 km || 
|-id=755 bgcolor=#fefefe
| 134755 ||  || — || February 2, 2000 || Socorro || LINEAR || — || align=right | 1.3 km || 
|-id=756 bgcolor=#E9E9E9
| 134756 ||  || — || February 2, 2000 || Socorro || LINEAR || — || align=right | 2.2 km || 
|-id=757 bgcolor=#E9E9E9
| 134757 ||  || — || February 2, 2000 || Socorro || LINEAR || HNS || align=right | 2.0 km || 
|-id=758 bgcolor=#E9E9E9
| 134758 ||  || — || February 2, 2000 || Socorro || LINEAR || — || align=right | 3.3 km || 
|-id=759 bgcolor=#FA8072
| 134759 ||  || — || February 1, 2000 || Catalina || CSS || H || align=right data-sort-value="0.99" | 990 m || 
|-id=760 bgcolor=#E9E9E9
| 134760 ||  || — || February 2, 2000 || Socorro || LINEAR || — || align=right | 4.3 km || 
|-id=761 bgcolor=#fefefe
| 134761 ||  || — || February 8, 2000 || Prescott || P. G. Comba || — || align=right | 1.7 km || 
|-id=762 bgcolor=#E9E9E9
| 134762 ||  || — || February 4, 2000 || Socorro || LINEAR || — || align=right | 3.3 km || 
|-id=763 bgcolor=#E9E9E9
| 134763 ||  || — || February 5, 2000 || Socorro || LINEAR || — || align=right | 4.1 km || 
|-id=764 bgcolor=#E9E9E9
| 134764 ||  || — || February 6, 2000 || Socorro || LINEAR || — || align=right | 3.7 km || 
|-id=765 bgcolor=#E9E9E9
| 134765 ||  || — || February 8, 2000 || Socorro || LINEAR || — || align=right | 1.8 km || 
|-id=766 bgcolor=#fefefe
| 134766 ||  || — || February 5, 2000 || Socorro || LINEAR || H || align=right | 1.6 km || 
|-id=767 bgcolor=#C2FFFF
| 134767 ||  || — || February 11, 2000 || Socorro || LINEAR || L4 || align=right | 15 km || 
|-id=768 bgcolor=#E9E9E9
| 134768 ||  || — || February 3, 2000 || Socorro || LINEAR || — || align=right | 2.0 km || 
|-id=769 bgcolor=#fefefe
| 134769 ||  || — || February 25, 2000 || Socorro || LINEAR || H || align=right data-sort-value="0.92" | 920 m || 
|-id=770 bgcolor=#E9E9E9
| 134770 ||  || — || February 26, 2000 || Kitt Peak || Spacewatch || — || align=right | 2.1 km || 
|-id=771 bgcolor=#E9E9E9
| 134771 ||  || — || February 29, 2000 || Socorro || LINEAR || — || align=right | 2.4 km || 
|-id=772 bgcolor=#E9E9E9
| 134772 ||  || — || February 29, 2000 || Socorro || LINEAR || — || align=right | 2.9 km || 
|-id=773 bgcolor=#E9E9E9
| 134773 ||  || — || February 29, 2000 || Socorro || LINEAR || — || align=right | 2.0 km || 
|-id=774 bgcolor=#E9E9E9
| 134774 ||  || — || February 29, 2000 || Socorro || LINEAR || — || align=right | 1.5 km || 
|-id=775 bgcolor=#E9E9E9
| 134775 ||  || — || February 29, 2000 || Socorro || LINEAR || — || align=right | 3.0 km || 
|-id=776 bgcolor=#E9E9E9
| 134776 ||  || — || February 29, 2000 || Socorro || LINEAR || WIT || align=right | 2.2 km || 
|-id=777 bgcolor=#E9E9E9
| 134777 ||  || — || February 29, 2000 || Socorro || LINEAR || — || align=right | 2.5 km || 
|-id=778 bgcolor=#E9E9E9
| 134778 ||  || — || February 29, 2000 || Socorro || LINEAR || — || align=right | 2.6 km || 
|-id=779 bgcolor=#E9E9E9
| 134779 ||  || — || February 29, 2000 || Socorro || LINEAR || — || align=right | 2.4 km || 
|-id=780 bgcolor=#E9E9E9
| 134780 ||  || — || February 29, 2000 || Socorro || LINEAR || — || align=right | 3.4 km || 
|-id=781 bgcolor=#E9E9E9
| 134781 ||  || — || February 29, 2000 || Socorro || LINEAR || EUN || align=right | 2.2 km || 
|-id=782 bgcolor=#E9E9E9
| 134782 ||  || — || February 29, 2000 || Socorro || LINEAR || — || align=right | 4.4 km || 
|-id=783 bgcolor=#E9E9E9
| 134783 ||  || — || February 27, 2000 || Kitt Peak || Spacewatch || — || align=right | 2.4 km || 
|-id=784 bgcolor=#E9E9E9
| 134784 ||  || — || February 28, 2000 || Socorro || LINEAR || — || align=right | 1.7 km || 
|-id=785 bgcolor=#E9E9E9
| 134785 ||  || — || February 29, 2000 || Socorro || LINEAR || MAR || align=right | 1.7 km || 
|-id=786 bgcolor=#E9E9E9
| 134786 ||  || — || February 29, 2000 || Socorro || LINEAR || — || align=right | 2.7 km || 
|-id=787 bgcolor=#E9E9E9
| 134787 ||  || — || February 29, 2000 || Socorro || LINEAR || — || align=right | 2.0 km || 
|-id=788 bgcolor=#fefefe
| 134788 ||  || — || February 25, 2000 || Kitt Peak || Spacewatch || — || align=right | 1.7 km || 
|-id=789 bgcolor=#E9E9E9
| 134789 ||  || — || March 3, 2000 || Socorro || LINEAR || GEF || align=right | 2.1 km || 
|-id=790 bgcolor=#E9E9E9
| 134790 ||  || — || March 4, 2000 || Socorro || LINEAR || — || align=right | 6.3 km || 
|-id=791 bgcolor=#E9E9E9
| 134791 ||  || — || March 3, 2000 || Kitt Peak || Spacewatch || — || align=right | 3.7 km || 
|-id=792 bgcolor=#d6d6d6
| 134792 ||  || — || March 5, 2000 || Socorro || LINEAR || — || align=right | 5.8 km || 
|-id=793 bgcolor=#E9E9E9
| 134793 ||  || — || March 5, 2000 || Gnosca || S. Sposetti || — || align=right | 3.8 km || 
|-id=794 bgcolor=#E9E9E9
| 134794 ||  || — || March 4, 2000 || Socorro || LINEAR || EUN || align=right | 4.7 km || 
|-id=795 bgcolor=#E9E9E9
| 134795 ||  || — || March 5, 2000 || Socorro || LINEAR || — || align=right | 2.7 km || 
|-id=796 bgcolor=#E9E9E9
| 134796 ||  || — || March 5, 2000 || Socorro || LINEAR || — || align=right | 2.1 km || 
|-id=797 bgcolor=#E9E9E9
| 134797 ||  || — || March 8, 2000 || Kitt Peak || Spacewatch || — || align=right | 1.8 km || 
|-id=798 bgcolor=#E9E9E9
| 134798 ||  || — || March 5, 2000 || Socorro || LINEAR || — || align=right | 4.2 km || 
|-id=799 bgcolor=#E9E9E9
| 134799 ||  || — || March 5, 2000 || Socorro || LINEAR || EUN || align=right | 3.6 km || 
|-id=800 bgcolor=#E9E9E9
| 134800 ||  || — || March 5, 2000 || Socorro || LINEAR || — || align=right | 3.2 km || 
|}

134801–134900 

|-bgcolor=#E9E9E9
| 134801 ||  || — || March 8, 2000 || Socorro || LINEAR || GEF || align=right | 2.7 km || 
|-id=802 bgcolor=#E9E9E9
| 134802 ||  || — || March 8, 2000 || Socorro || LINEAR || — || align=right | 2.5 km || 
|-id=803 bgcolor=#E9E9E9
| 134803 ||  || — || March 10, 2000 || Socorro || LINEAR || — || align=right | 4.0 km || 
|-id=804 bgcolor=#E9E9E9
| 134804 ||  || — || March 9, 2000 || Kitt Peak || Spacewatch || DOR || align=right | 5.3 km || 
|-id=805 bgcolor=#E9E9E9
| 134805 ||  || — || March 10, 2000 || Kitt Peak || Spacewatch || — || align=right | 3.0 km || 
|-id=806 bgcolor=#E9E9E9
| 134806 ||  || — || March 3, 2000 || Socorro || LINEAR || — || align=right | 4.2 km || 
|-id=807 bgcolor=#E9E9E9
| 134807 ||  || — || March 3, 2000 || Socorro || LINEAR || — || align=right | 2.9 km || 
|-id=808 bgcolor=#d6d6d6
| 134808 ||  || — || March 3, 2000 || Socorro || LINEAR || ITH || align=right | 2.9 km || 
|-id=809 bgcolor=#d6d6d6
| 134809 ||  || — || March 4, 2000 || Socorro || LINEAR || — || align=right | 6.8 km || 
|-id=810 bgcolor=#E9E9E9
| 134810 ||  || — || March 4, 2000 || Socorro || LINEAR || BRU || align=right | 5.0 km || 
|-id=811 bgcolor=#E9E9E9
| 134811 ||  || — || March 1, 2000 || Kitt Peak || Spacewatch || — || align=right | 2.8 km || 
|-id=812 bgcolor=#E9E9E9
| 134812 ||  || — || March 3, 2000 || Socorro || LINEAR || — || align=right | 3.7 km || 
|-id=813 bgcolor=#fefefe
| 134813 ||  || — || March 27, 2000 || Socorro || LINEAR || H || align=right data-sort-value="0.99" | 990 m || 
|-id=814 bgcolor=#d6d6d6
| 134814 ||  || — || March 29, 2000 || Socorro || LINEAR || — || align=right | 6.2 km || 
|-id=815 bgcolor=#E9E9E9
| 134815 ||  || — || March 27, 2000 || Anderson Mesa || LONEOS || BRU || align=right | 6.4 km || 
|-id=816 bgcolor=#fefefe
| 134816 ||  || — || April 4, 2000 || Socorro || LINEAR || H || align=right | 1.6 km || 
|-id=817 bgcolor=#E9E9E9
| 134817 ||  || — || April 5, 2000 || Socorro || LINEAR || — || align=right | 2.0 km || 
|-id=818 bgcolor=#E9E9E9
| 134818 ||  || — || April 5, 2000 || Socorro || LINEAR || RAF || align=right | 2.5 km || 
|-id=819 bgcolor=#E9E9E9
| 134819 ||  || — || April 5, 2000 || Socorro || LINEAR || — || align=right | 2.7 km || 
|-id=820 bgcolor=#fefefe
| 134820 ||  || — || April 7, 2000 || Socorro || LINEAR || H || align=right | 1.0 km || 
|-id=821 bgcolor=#d6d6d6
| 134821 ||  || — || April 7, 2000 || Socorro || LINEAR || — || align=right | 6.8 km || 
|-id=822 bgcolor=#E9E9E9
| 134822 ||  || — || April 2, 2000 || Anderson Mesa || LONEOS || PAD || align=right | 3.5 km || 
|-id=823 bgcolor=#E9E9E9
| 134823 ||  || — || April 5, 2000 || Kitt Peak || Spacewatch || — || align=right | 4.2 km || 
|-id=824 bgcolor=#E9E9E9
| 134824 ||  || — || April 5, 2000 || Socorro || LINEAR || — || align=right | 4.8 km || 
|-id=825 bgcolor=#E9E9E9
| 134825 ||  || — || April 6, 2000 || Anderson Mesa || LONEOS || — || align=right | 3.0 km || 
|-id=826 bgcolor=#E9E9E9
| 134826 ||  || — || April 25, 2000 || Kitt Peak || Spacewatch || — || align=right | 2.7 km || 
|-id=827 bgcolor=#d6d6d6
| 134827 ||  || — || April 24, 2000 || Kitt Peak || Spacewatch || — || align=right | 3.7 km || 
|-id=828 bgcolor=#E9E9E9
| 134828 ||  || — || April 28, 2000 || Socorro || LINEAR || — || align=right | 6.3 km || 
|-id=829 bgcolor=#d6d6d6
| 134829 ||  || — || April 28, 2000 || Socorro || LINEAR || — || align=right | 4.7 km || 
|-id=830 bgcolor=#d6d6d6
| 134830 ||  || — || April 24, 2000 || Anderson Mesa || LONEOS || — || align=right | 5.3 km || 
|-id=831 bgcolor=#d6d6d6
| 134831 ||  || — || April 25, 2000 || Anderson Mesa || LONEOS || KOR || align=right | 2.6 km || 
|-id=832 bgcolor=#d6d6d6
| 134832 ||  || — || April 25, 2000 || Anderson Mesa || LONEOS || — || align=right | 4.5 km || 
|-id=833 bgcolor=#E9E9E9
| 134833 ||  || — || April 28, 2000 || Kitt Peak || Spacewatch || — || align=right | 3.6 km || 
|-id=834 bgcolor=#fefefe
| 134834 ||  || — || April 27, 2000 || Anderson Mesa || LONEOS || H || align=right | 1.0 km || 
|-id=835 bgcolor=#d6d6d6
| 134835 ||  || — || April 27, 2000 || Socorro || LINEAR || — || align=right | 4.9 km || 
|-id=836 bgcolor=#fefefe
| 134836 ||  || — || April 30, 2000 || Anderson Mesa || LONEOS || H || align=right | 1.1 km || 
|-id=837 bgcolor=#fefefe
| 134837 ||  || — || May 1, 2000 || Haleakala || NEAT || H || align=right | 1.2 km || 
|-id=838 bgcolor=#E9E9E9
| 134838 ||  || — || May 6, 2000 || Socorro || LINEAR || — || align=right | 3.8 km || 
|-id=839 bgcolor=#d6d6d6
| 134839 ||  || — || May 7, 2000 || Socorro || LINEAR || — || align=right | 4.0 km || 
|-id=840 bgcolor=#d6d6d6
| 134840 ||  || — || May 6, 2000 || Socorro || LINEAR || — || align=right | 6.9 km || 
|-id=841 bgcolor=#d6d6d6
| 134841 ||  || — || May 6, 2000 || Socorro || LINEAR || — || align=right | 5.2 km || 
|-id=842 bgcolor=#d6d6d6
| 134842 ||  || — || May 5, 2000 || Socorro || LINEAR || — || align=right | 4.1 km || 
|-id=843 bgcolor=#E9E9E9
| 134843 ||  || — || May 5, 2000 || Kitt Peak || Spacewatch || — || align=right | 2.8 km || 
|-id=844 bgcolor=#E9E9E9
| 134844 ||  || — || May 1, 2000 || Anderson Mesa || LONEOS || AGN || align=right | 2.2 km || 
|-id=845 bgcolor=#fefefe
| 134845 ||  || — || May 27, 2000 || Socorro || LINEAR || H || align=right | 1.3 km || 
|-id=846 bgcolor=#d6d6d6
| 134846 ||  || — || May 28, 2000 || Socorro || LINEAR || — || align=right | 4.8 km || 
|-id=847 bgcolor=#d6d6d6
| 134847 ||  || — || May 27, 2000 || Socorro || LINEAR || TIR || align=right | 6.6 km || 
|-id=848 bgcolor=#d6d6d6
| 134848 ||  || — || May 27, 2000 || Anderson Mesa || LONEOS || — || align=right | 6.2 km || 
|-id=849 bgcolor=#d6d6d6
| 134849 ||  || — || May 27, 2000 || Anderson Mesa || LONEOS || AEG || align=right | 4.9 km || 
|-id=850 bgcolor=#d6d6d6
| 134850 ||  || — || May 28, 2000 || Anderson Mesa || LONEOS || EUP || align=right | 7.2 km || 
|-id=851 bgcolor=#d6d6d6
| 134851 ||  || — || June 6, 2000 || Anderson Mesa || LONEOS || ALA || align=right | 13 km || 
|-id=852 bgcolor=#d6d6d6
| 134852 || 2000 MM || — || June 24, 2000 || Haleakala || NEAT || EUP || align=right | 7.0 km || 
|-id=853 bgcolor=#d6d6d6
| 134853 ||  || — || July 7, 2000 || Anderson Mesa || LONEOS || — || align=right | 6.0 km || 
|-id=854 bgcolor=#d6d6d6
| 134854 ||  || — || July 23, 2000 || Socorro || LINEAR || — || align=right | 5.0 km || 
|-id=855 bgcolor=#d6d6d6
| 134855 ||  || — || July 23, 2000 || Socorro || LINEAR || EUP || align=right | 9.6 km || 
|-id=856 bgcolor=#fefefe
| 134856 ||  || — || July 23, 2000 || Socorro || LINEAR || — || align=right | 1.3 km || 
|-id=857 bgcolor=#d6d6d6
| 134857 ||  || — || July 23, 2000 || Socorro || LINEAR || — || align=right | 7.1 km || 
|-id=858 bgcolor=#d6d6d6
| 134858 ||  || — || July 29, 2000 || Anderson Mesa || LONEOS || — || align=right | 7.9 km || 
|-id=859 bgcolor=#d6d6d6
| 134859 ||  || — || July 29, 2000 || Anderson Mesa || LONEOS || — || align=right | 8.9 km || 
|-id=860 bgcolor=#C2E0FF
| 134860 ||  || — || July 29, 2000 || Cerro Tololo || M. W. Buie, S. D. Kern || cubewano (cold)moon || align=right | 241 km || 
|-id=861 bgcolor=#E9E9E9
| 134861 ||  || — || July 29, 2000 || Anderson Mesa || LONEOS || — || align=right | 2.5 km || 
|-id=862 bgcolor=#d6d6d6
| 134862 ||  || — || August 1, 2000 || Socorro || LINEAR || — || align=right | 9.6 km || 
|-id=863 bgcolor=#FA8072
| 134863 ||  || — || August 2, 2000 || Socorro || LINEAR || — || align=right data-sort-value="0.94" | 940 m || 
|-id=864 bgcolor=#d6d6d6
| 134864 ||  || — || August 1, 2000 || Socorro || LINEAR || EOS || align=right | 4.7 km || 
|-id=865 bgcolor=#d6d6d6
| 134865 ||  || — || August 24, 2000 || Socorro || LINEAR || — || align=right | 6.2 km || 
|-id=866 bgcolor=#d6d6d6
| 134866 ||  || — || August 24, 2000 || Socorro || LINEAR || KOR || align=right | 2.5 km || 
|-id=867 bgcolor=#d6d6d6
| 134867 ||  || — || August 24, 2000 || Socorro || LINEAR || THM || align=right | 5.6 km || 
|-id=868 bgcolor=#d6d6d6
| 134868 ||  || — || August 24, 2000 || Socorro || LINEAR || 7:4 || align=right | 7.9 km || 
|-id=869 bgcolor=#d6d6d6
| 134869 ||  || — || August 25, 2000 || Socorro || LINEAR || — || align=right | 6.7 km || 
|-id=870 bgcolor=#d6d6d6
| 134870 ||  || — || August 24, 2000 || Socorro || LINEAR || 7:4 || align=right | 6.9 km || 
|-id=871 bgcolor=#d6d6d6
| 134871 ||  || — || August 25, 2000 || Socorro || LINEAR || HYG || align=right | 7.5 km || 
|-id=872 bgcolor=#d6d6d6
| 134872 ||  || — || August 25, 2000 || Socorro || LINEAR || HYG || align=right | 5.3 km || 
|-id=873 bgcolor=#d6d6d6
| 134873 ||  || — || August 25, 2000 || Socorro || LINEAR || URS || align=right | 12 km || 
|-id=874 bgcolor=#E9E9E9
| 134874 ||  || — || August 24, 2000 || Socorro || LINEAR || — || align=right | 4.2 km || 
|-id=875 bgcolor=#d6d6d6
| 134875 ||  || — || August 24, 2000 || Socorro || LINEAR || — || align=right | 5.8 km || 
|-id=876 bgcolor=#d6d6d6
| 134876 ||  || — || August 29, 2000 || Socorro || LINEAR || — || align=right | 6.2 km || 
|-id=877 bgcolor=#d6d6d6
| 134877 ||  || — || August 26, 2000 || Socorro || LINEAR || — || align=right | 7.3 km || 
|-id=878 bgcolor=#E9E9E9
| 134878 ||  || — || August 26, 2000 || Socorro || LINEAR || — || align=right | 3.9 km || 
|-id=879 bgcolor=#d6d6d6
| 134879 ||  || — || August 31, 2000 || Socorro || LINEAR || — || align=right | 4.3 km || 
|-id=880 bgcolor=#d6d6d6
| 134880 ||  || — || August 21, 2000 || Anderson Mesa || LONEOS || — || align=right | 6.8 km || 
|-id=881 bgcolor=#d6d6d6
| 134881 ||  || — || August 21, 2000 || Anderson Mesa || LONEOS || — || align=right | 5.7 km || 
|-id=882 bgcolor=#fefefe
| 134882 ||  || — || September 1, 2000 || Socorro || LINEAR || FLO || align=right | 1.6 km || 
|-id=883 bgcolor=#fefefe
| 134883 ||  || — || September 3, 2000 || Kitt Peak || Spacewatch || — || align=right | 1.1 km || 
|-id=884 bgcolor=#d6d6d6
| 134884 ||  || — || September 1, 2000 || Socorro || LINEAR || — || align=right | 7.7 km || 
|-id=885 bgcolor=#d6d6d6
| 134885 ||  || — || September 24, 2000 || Socorro || LINEAR || — || align=right | 7.3 km || 
|-id=886 bgcolor=#fefefe
| 134886 ||  || — || September 24, 2000 || Socorro || LINEAR || — || align=right | 1.6 km || 
|-id=887 bgcolor=#fefefe
| 134887 ||  || — || September 24, 2000 || Socorro || LINEAR || NYS || align=right | 1.4 km || 
|-id=888 bgcolor=#fefefe
| 134888 ||  || — || September 24, 2000 || Socorro || LINEAR || — || align=right | 1.3 km || 
|-id=889 bgcolor=#fefefe
| 134889 ||  || — || September 24, 2000 || Socorro || LINEAR || — || align=right data-sort-value="0.90" | 900 m || 
|-id=890 bgcolor=#E9E9E9
| 134890 ||  || — || September 26, 2000 || Socorro || LINEAR || — || align=right | 3.7 km || 
|-id=891 bgcolor=#d6d6d6
| 134891 ||  || — || September 27, 2000 || Socorro || LINEAR || — || align=right | 5.1 km || 
|-id=892 bgcolor=#d6d6d6
| 134892 ||  || — || September 24, 2000 || Socorro || LINEAR || — || align=right | 5.6 km || 
|-id=893 bgcolor=#fefefe
| 134893 ||  || — || September 24, 2000 || Socorro || LINEAR || — || align=right | 1.2 km || 
|-id=894 bgcolor=#E9E9E9
| 134894 ||  || — || September 24, 2000 || Socorro || LINEAR || — || align=right | 3.6 km || 
|-id=895 bgcolor=#d6d6d6
| 134895 ||  || — || October 25, 2000 || Socorro || LINEAR || — || align=right | 3.9 km || 
|-id=896 bgcolor=#FA8072
| 134896 ||  || — || November 21, 2000 || Socorro || LINEAR || — || align=right | 1.1 km || 
|-id=897 bgcolor=#fefefe
| 134897 ||  || — || November 21, 2000 || Socorro || LINEAR || — || align=right | 3.9 km || 
|-id=898 bgcolor=#fefefe
| 134898 ||  || — || November 20, 2000 || Socorro || LINEAR || — || align=right | 1.6 km || 
|-id=899 bgcolor=#fefefe
| 134899 ||  || — || November 20, 2000 || Socorro || LINEAR || — || align=right | 1.4 km || 
|-id=900 bgcolor=#E9E9E9
| 134900 ||  || — || November 20, 2000 || Socorro || LINEAR || JUN || align=right | 2.7 km || 
|}

134901–135000 

|-bgcolor=#d6d6d6
| 134901 ||  || — || November 30, 2000 || Socorro || LINEAR || — || align=right | 4.4 km || 
|-id=902 bgcolor=#fefefe
| 134902 ||  || — || November 20, 2000 || Anderson Mesa || LONEOS || — || align=right | 1.1 km || 
|-id=903 bgcolor=#fefefe
| 134903 ||  || — || December 1, 2000 || Socorro || LINEAR || — || align=right | 1.6 km || 
|-id=904 bgcolor=#fefefe
| 134904 ||  || — || December 1, 2000 || Socorro || LINEAR || — || align=right | 1.8 km || 
|-id=905 bgcolor=#fefefe
| 134905 ||  || — || December 4, 2000 || Socorro || LINEAR || — || align=right | 1.9 km || 
|-id=906 bgcolor=#fefefe
| 134906 ||  || — || December 4, 2000 || Socorro || LINEAR || — || align=right | 1.7 km || 
|-id=907 bgcolor=#fefefe
| 134907 ||  || — || December 21, 2000 || Kitt Peak || Spacewatch || — || align=right | 1.1 km || 
|-id=908 bgcolor=#fefefe
| 134908 ||  || — || December 30, 2000 || Socorro || LINEAR || — || align=right | 1.8 km || 
|-id=909 bgcolor=#d6d6d6
| 134909 ||  || — || December 30, 2000 || Socorro || LINEAR || 3:2 || align=right | 8.9 km || 
|-id=910 bgcolor=#fefefe
| 134910 ||  || — || December 30, 2000 || Socorro || LINEAR || — || align=right | 1.9 km || 
|-id=911 bgcolor=#fefefe
| 134911 ||  || — || December 30, 2000 || Socorro || LINEAR || — || align=right | 1.7 km || 
|-id=912 bgcolor=#fefefe
| 134912 ||  || — || December 30, 2000 || Socorro || LINEAR || — || align=right | 1.4 km || 
|-id=913 bgcolor=#fefefe
| 134913 ||  || — || December 30, 2000 || Socorro || LINEAR || — || align=right | 1.4 km || 
|-id=914 bgcolor=#E9E9E9
| 134914 ||  || — || December 30, 2000 || Socorro || LINEAR || — || align=right | 2.3 km || 
|-id=915 bgcolor=#fefefe
| 134915 ||  || — || December 30, 2000 || Socorro || LINEAR || V || align=right | 1.3 km || 
|-id=916 bgcolor=#fefefe
| 134916 ||  || — || December 30, 2000 || Socorro || LINEAR || V || align=right | 1.4 km || 
|-id=917 bgcolor=#fefefe
| 134917 ||  || — || December 30, 2000 || Socorro || LINEAR || V || align=right | 1.3 km || 
|-id=918 bgcolor=#fefefe
| 134918 ||  || — || December 30, 2000 || Socorro || LINEAR || — || align=right | 1.6 km || 
|-id=919 bgcolor=#fefefe
| 134919 ||  || — || December 30, 2000 || Socorro || LINEAR || — || align=right | 1.3 km || 
|-id=920 bgcolor=#fefefe
| 134920 ||  || — || December 30, 2000 || Socorro || LINEAR || V || align=right | 1.2 km || 
|-id=921 bgcolor=#fefefe
| 134921 ||  || — || December 30, 2000 || Socorro || LINEAR || FLO || align=right | 1.2 km || 
|-id=922 bgcolor=#fefefe
| 134922 ||  || — || December 28, 2000 || Socorro || LINEAR || — || align=right | 3.6 km || 
|-id=923 bgcolor=#E9E9E9
| 134923 ||  || — || December 30, 2000 || Socorro || LINEAR || GEF || align=right | 2.5 km || 
|-id=924 bgcolor=#fefefe
| 134924 ||  || — || December 30, 2000 || Socorro || LINEAR || FLO || align=right | 1.2 km || 
|-id=925 bgcolor=#fefefe
| 134925 ||  || — || December 30, 2000 || Socorro || LINEAR || V || align=right | 1.4 km || 
|-id=926 bgcolor=#fefefe
| 134926 ||  || — || December 30, 2000 || Socorro || LINEAR || V || align=right | 1.2 km || 
|-id=927 bgcolor=#fefefe
| 134927 ||  || — || December 30, 2000 || Socorro || LINEAR || — || align=right | 1.5 km || 
|-id=928 bgcolor=#FA8072
| 134928 ||  || — || January 2, 2001 || Kitt Peak || Spacewatch || — || align=right | 1.4 km || 
|-id=929 bgcolor=#fefefe
| 134929 ||  || — || January 2, 2001 || Socorro || LINEAR || — || align=right | 2.0 km || 
|-id=930 bgcolor=#fefefe
| 134930 ||  || — || January 5, 2001 || Socorro || LINEAR || — || align=right | 1.7 km || 
|-id=931 bgcolor=#fefefe
| 134931 ||  || — || January 4, 2001 || Socorro || LINEAR || FLO || align=right | 1.2 km || 
|-id=932 bgcolor=#fefefe
| 134932 ||  || — || January 19, 2001 || Socorro || LINEAR || — || align=right | 1.7 km || 
|-id=933 bgcolor=#fefefe
| 134933 ||  || — || January 18, 2001 || Socorro || LINEAR || V || align=right | 1.2 km || 
|-id=934 bgcolor=#E9E9E9
| 134934 ||  || — || January 19, 2001 || Socorro || LINEAR || — || align=right | 2.2 km || 
|-id=935 bgcolor=#E9E9E9
| 134935 ||  || — || January 21, 2001 || Fair Oaks Ranch || J. V. McClusky || — || align=right | 3.2 km || 
|-id=936 bgcolor=#fefefe
| 134936 ||  || — || January 22, 2001 || Oaxaca || J. M. Roe || — || align=right | 2.8 km || 
|-id=937 bgcolor=#fefefe
| 134937 ||  || — || January 19, 2001 || Socorro || LINEAR || V || align=right | 1.4 km || 
|-id=938 bgcolor=#fefefe
| 134938 ||  || — || January 20, 2001 || Socorro || LINEAR || V || align=right | 1.3 km || 
|-id=939 bgcolor=#E9E9E9
| 134939 ||  || — || January 18, 2001 || Socorro || LINEAR || — || align=right | 3.4 km || 
|-id=940 bgcolor=#fefefe
| 134940 ||  || — || January 21, 2001 || Socorro || LINEAR || — || align=right | 1.4 km || 
|-id=941 bgcolor=#FA8072
| 134941 ||  || — || January 21, 2001 || Socorro || LINEAR || H || align=right | 1.7 km || 
|-id=942 bgcolor=#fefefe
| 134942 ||  || — || January 17, 2001 || Haleakala || NEAT || FLO || align=right | 1.5 km || 
|-id=943 bgcolor=#fefefe
| 134943 ||  || — || January 18, 2001 || Kitt Peak || Spacewatch || FLO || align=right | 1.3 km || 
|-id=944 bgcolor=#fefefe
| 134944 ||  || — || January 21, 2001 || Socorro || LINEAR || FLO || align=right | 1.2 km || 
|-id=945 bgcolor=#fefefe
| 134945 ||  || — || January 25, 2001 || Haleakala || NEAT || FLO || align=right | 1.2 km || 
|-id=946 bgcolor=#E9E9E9
| 134946 ||  || — || January 26, 2001 || Socorro || LINEAR || — || align=right | 4.8 km || 
|-id=947 bgcolor=#fefefe
| 134947 ||  || — || January 31, 2001 || Kitt Peak || Spacewatch || — || align=right | 1.7 km || 
|-id=948 bgcolor=#d6d6d6
| 134948 ||  || — || January 24, 2001 || Kitt Peak || Spacewatch || K-2 || align=right | 2.3 km || 
|-id=949 bgcolor=#fefefe
| 134949 || 2001 CR || — || February 1, 2001 || Socorro || LINEAR || — || align=right | 1.7 km || 
|-id=950 bgcolor=#fefefe
| 134950 ||  || — || February 1, 2001 || Socorro || LINEAR || — || align=right | 1.9 km || 
|-id=951 bgcolor=#fefefe
| 134951 ||  || — || February 1, 2001 || Socorro || LINEAR || FLO || align=right | 1.2 km || 
|-id=952 bgcolor=#fefefe
| 134952 ||  || — || February 1, 2001 || Socorro || LINEAR || V || align=right | 1.2 km || 
|-id=953 bgcolor=#fefefe
| 134953 ||  || — || February 4, 2001 || Socorro || LINEAR || PHO || align=right | 2.1 km || 
|-id=954 bgcolor=#fefefe
| 134954 ||  || — || February 2, 2001 || Anderson Mesa || LONEOS || V || align=right | 1.4 km || 
|-id=955 bgcolor=#fefefe
| 134955 ||  || — || February 13, 2001 || Socorro || LINEAR || — || align=right | 2.1 km || 
|-id=956 bgcolor=#fefefe
| 134956 ||  || — || February 17, 2001 || Haleakala || NEAT || — || align=right | 2.1 km || 
|-id=957 bgcolor=#C2FFFF
| 134957 ||  || — || February 16, 2001 || Socorro || LINEAR || L4 || align=right | 26 km || 
|-id=958 bgcolor=#fefefe
| 134958 ||  || — || February 17, 2001 || Socorro || LINEAR || FLO || align=right | 1.3 km || 
|-id=959 bgcolor=#fefefe
| 134959 ||  || — || February 19, 2001 || Socorro || LINEAR || — || align=right | 1.4 km || 
|-id=960 bgcolor=#fefefe
| 134960 ||  || — || February 19, 2001 || Socorro || LINEAR || — || align=right | 1.6 km || 
|-id=961 bgcolor=#fefefe
| 134961 ||  || — || February 19, 2001 || Socorro || LINEAR || — || align=right | 1.3 km || 
|-id=962 bgcolor=#fefefe
| 134962 ||  || — || February 19, 2001 || Socorro || LINEAR || NYS || align=right | 1.1 km || 
|-id=963 bgcolor=#fefefe
| 134963 ||  || — || February 22, 2001 || Kitt Peak || Spacewatch || V || align=right | 1.1 km || 
|-id=964 bgcolor=#fefefe
| 134964 ||  || — || February 17, 2001 || Socorro || LINEAR || FLO || align=right | 1.4 km || 
|-id=965 bgcolor=#C2FFFF
| 134965 ||  || — || February 17, 2001 || Haleakala || NEAT || L4 || align=right | 19 km || 
|-id=966 bgcolor=#fefefe
| 134966 ||  || — || February 16, 2001 || Socorro || LINEAR || — || align=right | 1.9 km || 
|-id=967 bgcolor=#fefefe
| 134967 ||  || — || February 16, 2001 || Haleakala || NEAT || — || align=right | 2.0 km || 
|-id=968 bgcolor=#fefefe
| 134968 ||  || — || February 19, 2001 || Socorro || LINEAR || FLO || align=right | 1.2 km || 
|-id=969 bgcolor=#fefefe
| 134969 ||  || — || March 1, 2001 || Socorro || LINEAR || — || align=right | 1.9 km || 
|-id=970 bgcolor=#FA8072
| 134970 ||  || — || March 2, 2001 || Anderson Mesa || LONEOS || — || align=right | 3.6 km || 
|-id=971 bgcolor=#fefefe
| 134971 ||  || — || March 15, 2001 || Anderson Mesa || LONEOS || LCI || align=right | 1.7 km || 
|-id=972 bgcolor=#fefefe
| 134972 ||  || — || March 15, 2001 || Socorro || LINEAR || — || align=right | 2.7 km || 
|-id=973 bgcolor=#fefefe
| 134973 || 2001 FA || — || March 16, 2001 || Badlands || Badlands Obs. || NYS || align=right | 1.3 km || 
|-id=974 bgcolor=#E9E9E9
| 134974 ||  || — || March 18, 2001 || Socorro || LINEAR || HNS || align=right | 2.9 km || 
|-id=975 bgcolor=#fefefe
| 134975 ||  || — || March 19, 2001 || Anderson Mesa || LONEOS || — || align=right | 1.5 km || 
|-id=976 bgcolor=#E9E9E9
| 134976 ||  || — || March 20, 2001 || Haleakala || NEAT || — || align=right | 2.1 km || 
|-id=977 bgcolor=#fefefe
| 134977 ||  || — || March 21, 2001 || Haleakala || NEAT || — || align=right | 1.7 km || 
|-id=978 bgcolor=#E9E9E9
| 134978 ||  || — || March 18, 2001 || Socorro || LINEAR || — || align=right | 2.7 km || 
|-id=979 bgcolor=#E9E9E9
| 134979 ||  || — || March 18, 2001 || Socorro || LINEAR || — || align=right | 3.0 km || 
|-id=980 bgcolor=#fefefe
| 134980 ||  || — || March 19, 2001 || Socorro || LINEAR || V || align=right | 1.3 km || 
|-id=981 bgcolor=#d6d6d6
| 134981 ||  || — || March 21, 2001 || Haleakala || NEAT || EMA || align=right | 5.6 km || 
|-id=982 bgcolor=#E9E9E9
| 134982 ||  || — || March 19, 2001 || Socorro || LINEAR || — || align=right | 1.9 km || 
|-id=983 bgcolor=#E9E9E9
| 134983 ||  || — || March 19, 2001 || Socorro || LINEAR || — || align=right | 4.0 km || 
|-id=984 bgcolor=#fefefe
| 134984 ||  || — || March 19, 2001 || Socorro || LINEAR || NYS || align=right | 1.5 km || 
|-id=985 bgcolor=#E9E9E9
| 134985 ||  || — || March 23, 2001 || Socorro || LINEAR || EUN || align=right | 2.0 km || 
|-id=986 bgcolor=#d6d6d6
| 134986 ||  || — || March 17, 2001 || Farpoint || Farpoint Obs. || — || align=right | 4.7 km || 
|-id=987 bgcolor=#E9E9E9
| 134987 ||  || — || March 19, 2001 || Anderson Mesa || LONEOS || — || align=right | 1.7 km || 
|-id=988 bgcolor=#E9E9E9
| 134988 ||  || — || March 19, 2001 || Anderson Mesa || LONEOS || — || align=right | 2.2 km || 
|-id=989 bgcolor=#fefefe
| 134989 ||  || — || March 23, 2001 || Anderson Mesa || LONEOS || — || align=right | 1.7 km || 
|-id=990 bgcolor=#E9E9E9
| 134990 ||  || — || March 20, 2001 || Haleakala || NEAT || EUN || align=right | 2.1 km || 
|-id=991 bgcolor=#fefefe
| 134991 ||  || — || March 21, 2001 || Haleakala || NEAT || SUL || align=right | 3.3 km || 
|-id=992 bgcolor=#E9E9E9
| 134992 ||  || — || March 21, 2001 || Haleakala || NEAT || — || align=right | 2.1 km || 
|-id=993 bgcolor=#E9E9E9
| 134993 ||  || — || March 24, 2001 || Anderson Mesa || LONEOS || — || align=right | 4.9 km || 
|-id=994 bgcolor=#E9E9E9
| 134994 ||  || — || March 24, 2001 || Haleakala || NEAT || — || align=right | 2.8 km || 
|-id=995 bgcolor=#E9E9E9
| 134995 ||  || — || March 26, 2001 || Socorro || LINEAR || — || align=right | 3.9 km || 
|-id=996 bgcolor=#E9E9E9
| 134996 ||  || — || March 27, 2001 || Anderson Mesa || LONEOS || — || align=right | 2.1 km || 
|-id=997 bgcolor=#d6d6d6
| 134997 ||  || — || March 24, 2001 || Socorro || LINEAR || TEL || align=right | 2.5 km || 
|-id=998 bgcolor=#d6d6d6
| 134998 ||  || — || April 15, 2001 || Socorro || LINEAR || ALA || align=right | 9.2 km || 
|-id=999 bgcolor=#d6d6d6
| 134999 ||  || — || April 16, 2001 || Socorro || LINEAR || — || align=right | 9.0 km || 
|-id=000 bgcolor=#E9E9E9
| 135000 ||  || — || April 21, 2001 || Socorro || LINEAR || — || align=right | 3.4 km || 
|}

References

External links 
 Discovery Circumstances: Numbered Minor Planets (130001)–(135000) (IAU Minor Planet Center)

0134